= List of Amara species =

Amara is a genus of carabid beetles containing 642 species.

== Amara species ==
- Amara abbreviata (Chaudoir, 1842)
- Amara abdominalis (Motschulsky, 1844)
- Amara aberrans Baudi di Selva, 1864
- Amara aenea (DeGeer, 1774)
- Amara aeneola Poppius, 1906
- Amara aeneopolita Casey, 1918
- Amara affinis Dejean, 1828
- Amara africana Putzeys, 1872
- Amara agona Tschitscherine, 1898
- Amara ahngeriana Tschitscherine, 1903
- Amara aidereensis Hieke, 2002
- Amara aimonissabaudiae Baliani, 1932
- Amara alacris Tschitscherine, 1899
- Amara alaiensis Tschitscherine, 1894
- Amara albarracina Hieke, 1984
- Amara alecto Andrewes, 1930
- Amara alexandriensis Hieke, 1988
- Amara alpestris A. & G.B.Villa, 1833
- Amara alpicola Dejean, 1828
- Amara alpina (Paykull, 1790)
- Amara altiphila Hieke, 1995
- Amara altissima Hieke, 1981
- Amara ambulans Zimmermann, 1832
- Amara amnenkorensis Hieke, 2003
- Amara ampliata (Bates, 1873)
- Amara andreae Tschitscherine, 1898
- Amara andrewesi Baliani, 1932
- Amara androphoba Hieke, 2010
- Amara angustata (Say, 1823)
- Amara angustatoides Hieke, 2000
- Amara annapurnensis Hieke, 2006
- Amara anterolata Hieke, 2001
- Amara anthobia A. & G.B.Villa, 1833
- Amara anxia Tschitscherine, 1898
- Amara apachensis Casey, 1884
- Amara apricaria (Paykull, 1790)
- Amara arcticola Poppius, 1906
- Amara arcuata (Putzeys, 1865)
- Amara arenaria (Putzeys, 1865)
- Amara armeniaca (Motschulsky, 1839)
- Amara arnoldiana (Kryzhanovskij, 1974)
- Amara arrowi Baliani, 1934
- Amara arusiensis Hieke, 2007
- Amara asiatica Jedlicka, 1957
- Amara astrabadensis Lutshnik, 1935
- Amara astrophila Hieke, 2000
- Amara asymmetrica (Tanaka, 1957)
- Amara atlantis Antoine, 1925
- Amara aulica (Panzer, 1796)
- Amara aurata Dejean, 1828
- Amara aurichalcea Germar, 1823
- Amara avida (Say, 1823)
- Amara badakshana (Kryzhanovskij, 1974)
- Amara baimashanica Hieke, 2006
- Amara baimaxueshanica Hieke, 2010
- Amara balangshana Hieke, 1994
- Amara baliani Jedlicka, 1935
- Amara balkhashica (Kabak, 1993)
- Amara bamidunyae Bates, 1878
- Amara banghaasi Baliani, 1933
- Amara banjyangi Hieke, 2002
- Amara barcelonensis Hieke, 1983
- Amara basillaris (Say, 1823)
- Amara batesi Csiki, 1929
- Amara begemdirica Hieke, 1978
- Amara beicki Hieke, 1988
- Amara belfragei G.Horn, 1892
- Amara beresowskii Hieke, 2005
- Amara beybienkoi (Kryzhanovskij, 1974)
- Amara bhutanensis Hieke, 2011
- Amara biarticulata Motschulsky, 1844
- Amara bickhardti Sainte-Claire Deville, 1906
- Amara bicolorata Hieke, 2002
- Amara bifrons (Gyllenhal, 1810)
- Amara bilocata Hieke, 2013
- Amara birmana Baliani, 1934
- Amara bischoffi Jedlicka, 1946
- Amara bispinula Hieke, 1997
- Amara blanchardi Hayward, 1908
- Amara bokori Csiki, 1929
- Amara boreodzhungarica Kabak, 1990
- Amara boreosichuana Hieke, 2010
- Amara bowashanensis Hieke, 2007
- Amara bradyta Hieke, 1988
- Amara bradytoides (Reitter, 1889)
- Amara bradytonota Hieke, 2001
- Amara brevicollis (Chaudoir, 1850)
- Amara brevis Dejean, 1828
- Amara browni Lindroth, 1968
- Amara brucei Andrewes, 1923
- Amara brunnea (Gyllenhal, 1810)
- Amara bucharica Tschitscherine, 1898
- Amara cadoudali Morvan, 1977
- Amara calathoides (Putzeys, 1866)
- Amara californica Dejean, 1828
- Amara cameroni Baliani, 1934
- Amara cardionota Putzeys, 1878
- Amara cardionotoides Hieke, 1988
- Amara cardui Dejean, 1831
- Amara carexiphaga Hieke, 2003
- Amara carinata (LeConte, 1847)
- Amara castanea (Putzeys, 1866)
- Amara celioides Baliani, 1934
- Amara chaklaensis Hieke, 2003
- Amara chalcea Dejean, 1828
- Amara chalciope (Bates, 1891)
- Amara chalcites Dejean, 1828
- Amara chalcophaea Bates, 1873
- Amara chamdoensis Hieke, 2002
- Amara charchirensis Hieke, 1993
- Amara charis Andrewes, 1930
- Amara chaudoiri Schaum, 1858
- Amara chihuahuae (Casey, 1918)
- Amara chinensis Tschitscherine, 1894
- Amara chlorotica Fairmaire, 1867
- Amara chodjaii Morvan, 1975
- Amara cholashanensis Hieke, 2000
- Amara chormaensis Hieke, 1995
- Amara chumbiensis Hieke, 2003
- Amara clarkei Hieke, 1976
- Amara coarctiloba Hieke, 2010
- Amara coelebs Hayward, 1908
- Amara coiffaiti (Jeanne, 1981)
- Amara colasi Paulian & Villiers, 1939
- Amara collivaga Hieke, 1997
- Amara colvillensis Lindroth, 1968
- Amara communis (Panzer, 1796)
- Amara concinna Zimmermann, 1832
- Amara conflata LeConte, 1855
- Amara confusa LeConte, 1847
- Amara congrua A. Morawitz, 1862
- Amara conoidea (Putzeys, 1866)
- Amara consericea Hieke, 2002
- Amara constantini Binaghi, 1946
- Amara consularis (Duftschmid, 1812)
- Amara convexa LeConte, 1847
- Amara convexior Stephens, 1828
- Amara convexiuscula (Marsham, 1802)
- Amara coraica Kolbe, 1886
- Amara cordicollis Ménétriés, 1832
- Amara corpulenta (Putzeys, 1866)
- Amara cottyi Coquerel, 1859
- Amara crassispina LeConte, 1855
- Amara crenata Dejean, 1828
- Amara cretica Hieke, 2009
- Amara cribrata (Putzeys, 1866)
- Amara cribricollis (Chaudoir, 1846)
- Amara crystallina Tschitscherine, 1903
- Amara cubicollis Hieke, 1981
- Amara cuniculina Dejean, 1831
- Amara cupreolata Putzeys, 1866
- Amara cursitans Zimmermann, 1832
- Amara curta Dejean, 1828
- Amara curtonotoides Hieke, 2000
- Amara curvibasis Hieke, 2002
- Amara cyrenaica Baliani, 1928
- Amara dabashanica Hieke, 2002
- Amara dalijiashanica Hieke, 1997
- Amara dalmatina Dejean, 1828
- Amara danilevskyi (Kabak, 1993)
- Amara daochengensis Hieke, 2000
- Amara darjelingensis Putzeys, 1877
- Amara daurica (Motschulsky, 1844)
- Amara davatchii (Morvan, 1975)
- Amara davidi Tschitscherine, 1897
- Amara daxueshanensis Hieke, 2000
- Amara dentibasis Hieke, 1988
- Amara deparca (Say, 1830)
- Amara depressangula Poppius, 1908
- Amara dequensis Hieke, 1999
- Amara deserta (Krynicki, 1832)
- Amara deuvei Hieke, 1988
- Amara diabolica Hieke, 1988
- Amara diaphana Tschitscherine, 1894
- Amara dichroa Putzeys, 1870
- Amara dickorei Hieke, 1995
- Amara discors Kirby, 1837
- Amara disproportionalis Hieke, 1993
- Amara dissimilis Tschitscherine, 1894
- Amara distinguenda A. Morawitz, 1862
- Amara ditomoides (Putzeys, 1866)
- Amara doderoi Baliani, 1926
- Amara dolosa Say, 1834
- Amara dongolaensis Hieke, 1997
- Amara dostali Hieke, 2010
- Amara durangensis Van Dyke, 1943
- Amara dux Tschitscherine, 1894
- Amara dzhungarica (Kryzhanovskij, 1974)
- Amara elborzensis Hejkal, 2000
- Amara elegantula Tschitscherine, 1899
- Amara elevata (Motschulsky, 1844)
- Amara elgonica Alluaud, 1939
- Amara ellipsis (Casey, 1918)
- Amara emancipata Lindroth, 1968
- Amara emmanuelivivesi E.Vives, 2018
- Amara equestris (Duftschmid, 1812)
- Amara erberi Hieke, 2000
- Amara eremicola Kryzhanovskij, 1962
- Amara erratica (Duftschmid, 1812)
- Amara erythrocnema Dejean, 1828
- Amara escalerai Hejkal, 2008
- Amara espagnoli (Vives Duran, 1971)
- Amara eurynota (Panzer, 1796)
- Amara everesti Hieke, 2003
- Amara exarata Dejean, 1828
- Amara eximia Dejean, 1828
- Amara exlineae Minsk & Hatch, 1939
- Amara externefoveata Hieke, 2002
- Amara extrema Hieke, 1995
- Amara fairmairei Raffray, 1886
- Amara fairmaireoides Hieke, 1978
- Amara famelica Zimmermann, 1832
- Amara familiaris (Duftschmid, 1812)
- Amara farcta LeConte, 1855
- Amara fausti (Reitter, 1888)
- Amara fedtschenkoi Tschitscherine, 1898
- Amara fervida Coquerel, 1859
- Amara flebilis (Casey, 1918)
- Amara floralis Gaubil, 1844
- Amara fodinae Mannerheim, 1825
- Amara fortis LeConte, 1880
- Amara franzi Hieke, 1981
- Amara frigida (Putzeys, 1867)
- Amara fritzhiekei (Sundukov, 2013)
- Amara frivola (Bates, 1878)
- Amara fujiii Tanaka, 1959
- Amara fulva (O.F. Müller, 1776)
- Amara fulvipes (Audinet-Serville, 1821)
- Amara fusca Dejean, 1828
- Amara fusgenua Hieke, 1999
- Amara gangotriensis Hieke, 1988
- Amara gansuensis Jedlicka, 1957
- Amara gartokiensis Hieke, 1988
- Amara gebleri Dejean, 1831
- Amara gerdmuelleri Hieke, 2010
- Amara gibba (LeConte, 1847)
- Amara gigantea (Motschulsky, 1844)
- Amara glabella Hieke, 1981
- Amara glabrata Dejean, 1828
- Amara glabricollis Jedlicka, 1938
- Amara glacialis (Mannerheim, 1853)
- Amara glebi Kabak, 2010
- Amara gobialtaica Hieke, 2000
- Amara golmudensis Hieke, 2004
- Amara goniodera Tschitscherine, 1895
- Amara gorevillei Hieke, 1970
- Amara gottelandi Antoine, 1931
- Amara gravidula Rosenhauer, 1856
- Amara hamadanensis Hejkal, 2008
- Amara hanhaica Tschitscherine, 1894
- Amara hannemanni Hieke, 1991
- Amara harpalina LeConte, 1855
- Amara harpaloides Dejean, 1828
- Amara harpalonota Hieke, 2001
- Amara hartmanni Hieke, 1997
- Amara haywardi Csiki, 1929
- Amara hedjazica Hieke, 1988
- Amara heinzorum Hieke, 1997
- Amara hejkali Hieke, 2008
- Amara helva Tschitscherine, 1898
- Amara hengduanshanica Hieke, 2002
- Amara hermoniensis Hieke, 1997
- Amara heterolata Hieke, 1997
- Amara hicksi Lindroth, 1968
- Amara hidakana (Habu, 1972)
- Amara hiekei (Kryzhanovskij & Mikhailov, 1987)
- Amara hiekeposthuma Marggi & C.Huber, 2017
- Amara hingstoni Baliani, 1934
- Amara hiogoensis (Bates, 1873)
- Amara histrio Andrewes, 1930
- Amara humerangula Hieke, 1995
- Amara hyalina Semenov, 1889
- Amara hyperborea Dejean, 1831
- Amara hypsela Andrewes, 1923
- Amara hypseloides Baliani, 1934
- Amara hypsophila Antoine, 1953
- Amara idahoana (Casey, 1924)
- Amara ignatovitschi Tschitscherine, 1894
- Amara impuncticollis (Say, 1823)
- Amara incrassata Baliani, 1934
- Amara inexspectata Hieke, 1990
- Amara infima (Duftschmid, 1812)
- Amara infuscata (Putzeys, 1866)
- Amara ingenua (Duftschmid, 1812)
- Amara insignis Dejean, 1831
- Amara insularis G.Horn, 1875
- Amara interfluviatilis Hieke, 2010
- Amara interstitialis Dejean, 1828
- Amara involans Hieke, 2000
- Amara iranica Kryzhanovskij, 1968
- Amara irkuteana Jedlicka, 1957
- Amara irkutensis Baliani, 1934
- Amara isajevi Kabak, 2008
- Amara isfahanensis Hieke, 1993
- Amara iturupensis Lafer, 1978
- Amara jacobina LeConte, 1855
- Amara jajalaensis Hieke, 1995
- Amara jannui Hieke, 1988
- Amara jintangensis Hieke, 2005
- Amara jordanica Hieke, 2002
- Amara juldusiensis Hieke, 1988
- Amara jumlana Hieke, 1981
- Amara junkarensis Hieke, 2012
- Amara kabakovi Hieke, 1976
- Amara kadyrbekovi (Kabak, 1991)
- Amara kailasensis Hieke, 1997
- Amara kampalaensis Hieke, 1997
- Amara kandbarica Hieke, 2007
- Amara kangdingensis Hieke, 1997
- Amara kangtissuensis Hieke, 2003
- Amara karalangana Hieke, 1996
- Amara karolana Hieke, 2003
- Amara karolanella Hieke, 2003
- Amara karzhantavensis (Kabak, 1991)
- Amara kaszabiella Hieke, 1983
- Amara kataevi (Sundukov, 2001)
- Amara katajewi Hieke, 2000
- Amara kavanaughi Hieke, 1990
- Amara kenzanensis (Ishida & Shibata, 1961)
- Amara kermanensis Hejkal, 2008
- Amara khoramabadensis Hejkal, 2008
- Amara khumbuensis Hieke, 2002
- Amara kilimandjarica Alluaud, 1927
- Amara kingdoni Baliani, 1934
- Amara kingdonoides Hieke, 2002
- Amara kinitzi Tschitscherine, 1899
- Amara kirghisica Kryzhanovskij, 1962
- Amara kiritshenkoi (Kryzhanovskij, 1974)
- Amara klapperichi Jedlicka, 1956
- Amara klausnitzeri Hieke, 2014
- Amara kocheri Antoine, 1933
- Amara kochi Baliani, 1940
- Amara kosagatschi Hieke, 1988
- Amara koslowi Hieke, 2010
- Amara krueperi Apfelbeck, 1904
- Amara kryshanowskii Hieke, 1976
- Amara kuenlunensis (Bates, 1878)
- Amara kulti Fassati, 1947
- Amara kurnakowi Hieke, 1994
- Amara kutscherai Hieke, 2006
- Amara lacustris LeConte, 1855
- Amara laevipennis Kirby, 1837
- Amara laevissima J.Sahlberg, 1880
- Amara laferi Hieke, 1976
- Amara lamia Andrewes, 1924
- Amara langtangensis Hieke, 2002
- Amara lantoscana Fauvel, 1888
- Amara laoshanensis Hieke, 2002
- Amara larisae (Sundukov, 2001)
- Amara laticarpa Bates, 1873
- Amara latior (Kirby, 1837)
- Amara latithorax Baliani, 1934
- Amara ledouxi Hieke, 1988
- Amara leleupi Basilewsky, 1962
- Amara lhatsensis Hieke, 2003
- Amara lhozhangensis Hieke, 2008
- Amara lindrothi Hieke, 1990
- Amara liouvillei Antoine, 1936
- Amara litangensis Hieke, 1994
- Amara littoralis Mannerheim, 1843
- Amara littorea C.G.Thomson, 1857
- Amara loeffleri Jedlicka, 1963
- Amara longula LeConte, 1855
- Amara lopatini Kryzhanovskij, 1968
- Amara lucens Baliani, 1943
- Amara lucida (Duftschmid, 1812)
- Amara lucidissima Baliani, 1932
- Amara lugens Zimmermann, 1832
- Amara lugubris (Casey, 1918)
- Amara lukasi Hejkal, 2002
- Amara lunicollis Schiødte, 1837
- Amara luppovae (Kryzhanovskij, 1962)
- Amara lutescens (Reitter, 1888)
- Amara lyrata Hieke, 1981
- Amara macronota (Solsky, 1875)
- Amara macros (Bates, 1883)
- Amara macrovata Hieke, 2009
- Amara magniceps Hieke, 1993
- Amara magnicollis Tschitscherine, 1894
- Amara maindroni Bedel, 1907
- Amara mairei Peyerimhoff, 1922
- Amara majuscula (Chaudoir, 1850)
- Amara makolskii Roubal, 1923
- Amara malacensis Hieke, 1983
- Amara manasluensis Hieke, 1997
- Amara mandarina Baliani, 1932
- Amara maoshanica Hieke, 2010
- Amara markamensis Hieke, 2000
- Amara martensi Hieke, 1981
- Amara medvedevi (Kryzhanovskij, 1974)
- Amara megacephala Gebler, 1830
- Amara merula (Casey, 1918)
- Amara messae Baliani, 1924
- Amara metallescens (Zimmermann, 1831)
- Amara metallicolor Hieke, 2010
- Amara micantula Hieke, 1994
- Amara microdera (Chaudoir, 1844)
- Amara microphthalma Baliani, 1943
- Amara mikae Lafer, 1980
- Amara milalaensis Hieke, 1997
- Amara mimetica Hieke, 2003
- Amara mimobeicki Hieke, 2010
- Amara minshanica Hieke, 1997
- Amara minuta (Motschulsky, 1844)
- Amara misella L.Miller, 1868
- Amara misera Tschitscherine, 1894
- Amara mixaltaica Hieke, 2000
- Amara moerens Zimmermann, 1832
- Amara molinar Hieke, 2010
- Amara molopiformis Kryzhanovskij, 1964
- Amara monastirensis Hieke, 2005
- Amara mondalaensis Hieke, 1997
- Amara monochroa Hieke, 2004
- Amara montana Dejean, 1828
- Amara montivaga Sturm, 1825
- Amara mopsa Hieke, 2000
- Amara morio Ménétriés, 1832
- Amara muchei Jedlicka, 1962
- Amara mukusensis Hieke, 1997
- Amara muliensis Hieke, 2000
- Amara multipunctata (Kabak, 1997)
- Amara municipalis (Duftschmid, 1812)
- Amara murgabica Tschitscherine, 1902
- Amara musculis (Say, 1823)
- Amara myanmarica Hieke, 2005
- Amara nataliae (Kryzhanovskij, 1974)
- Amara nebrioides (Kryzhanovskij, 1974)
- Amara necinfima Hieke, 2000
- Amara negrei Hieke, 1976
- Amara neomexicana (Casey, 1924)
- Amara neoscotica Casey, 1924
- Amara nepalensis Hieke, 1981
- Amara nexa (Casey, 1918)
- Amara nigricornis C.G.Thomson, 1857
- Amara nikolajewi Hieke, 1999
- Amara nila Andrewes, 1924
- Amara nitida Sturm, 1825
- Amara nobilis (Duftschmid, 1812)
- Amara notha Antoine, 1936
- Amara nyingtriensis Hieke, 2000
- Amara obesa (Say, 1823)
- Amara obscuripes Bates, 1873
- Amara obtusangula Baliani, 1934
- Amara occidentalis Hieke, 2002
- Amara ochracea (Gautier des Cottes, 1868)
- Amara oertzeni Hieke, 1984
- Amara ondai Morita, 1995
- Amara ooptera (Putzeys, 1865)
- Amara orienticola Lutshnik, 1935
- Amara otini Antoine, 1938
- Amara otiosa Casey, 1918
- Amara ovata (Fabricius, 1792)
- Amara ovicephala Hieke, 2002
- Amara ovtshinnikovi (Kabak, 1993)
- Amara oxiana Tschitscherine, 1898
- Amara pakistana Jedlicka, 1963
- Amara pallidula (Motschulsky, 1844)
- Amara pallipes Kirby, 1837
- Amara parkeri Baliani, 1934
- Amara parvicollis Gebler, 1833
- Amara patruelis Dejean, 1831
- Amara paumashanica Hieke, 1997
- Amara peculiaris Tschitscherine, 1894
- Amara pennsylvanica Hayward, 1908
- Amara perabdita Antoine, 1941
- Amara petrimontii Hieke, 1995
- Amara pingshiangi Jedlicka, 1957
- Amara pinguis Andrewes, 1930
- Amara pisangana Hieke, 1995
- Amara platynota Hieke, 1994
- Amara plebeja (Gyllenhal, 1810)
- Amara poggii Hieke, 1999
- Amara pomona Casey, 1918
- Amara potanini Tschitscherine, 1894
- Amara praetermissa (C.R.Sahlberg, 1827)
- Amara propinqua Ménétriés, 1832
- Amara proxima Putzeys, 1866
- Amara pseudobrunnea Lindroth, 1968
- Amara pseudocoraica Hieke, 2002
- Amara pseudofulva Ali, 1967
- Amara pseudoleleupi Hieke, 1976
- Amara pseudosimplicidens Lafer, 1980
- Amara pterostichina Hayward, 1908
- Amara pueli Antoine, 1923
- Amara pulchra Baliani, 1943
- Amara pulpani Kult, 1949
- Amara pumilio (Piochard de la Brûlerie, 1876)
- Amara puncticollis Dejean, 1828
- Amara punctipennis (Reitter, 1889)
- Amara pyrenaea Dejean, 1828
- Amara qinghaiensis Hieke, 2012
- Amara quenseli (Schönherr, 1806)
- Amara radjabii (Morvan, 1975)
- Amara rectangula LeConte, 1855
- Amara reflexicollis Motschulsky, 1844
- Amara refulgens (Reiche, 1875)
- Amara reichei Coquerel, 1859
- Amara reitteri Tschitscherine, 1894
- Amara religiosa Hieke, 2003
- Amara retingensis Hieke & J.Schmidt, 2009
- Amara robusta Baliani, 1932
- Amara rotundangula Hieke, 2002
- Amara rotundata Dejean, 1828
- Amara rotundicollis (L.Schaufuss, 1862)
- Amara rubens Tschitscherine, 1898
- Amara rubrica Haldeman, 1843
- Amara rufescens (Dejean, 1829)
- Amara rufipes Dejean, 1828
- Amara rufoaenea Dejean, 1828
- Amara rugulifera Hieke, 2002
- Amara rupicola Zimmermann, 1832
- Amara sabulosa (Audinet-Serville, 1821)
- Amara sachiana Hieke, 2003
- Amara saginata (Ménétriés, 1848)
- Amara samnitica A.Fiori, 1899
- Amara sanjuanensis Hatch, 1949
- Amara sankhuana Hieke, 1990
- Amara saphyrea Dejean, 1828
- Amara sawadai Hieke, 1994
- Amara saxicola Zimmermann, 1832
- Amara schawalleri Hieke, 1990
- Amara schilenkovi Hieke, 1988
- Amara schimperi Wencker, 1866
- Amara schmidti Hieke, 1994
- Amara schwarzi Hayward, 1908
- Amara schweigeri Hieke, 1997
- Amara scitula Zimmermann, 1832
- Amara sera Say, 1830
- Amara serdicana Apfelbeck, 1904
- Amara sericea Jedlicka, 1953
- Amara shaanxiensis Hieke, 2002
- Amara shahristana (Kryzhanovskij & Mikhailov, 1987)
- Amara shalulishanica Hieke & Kavanaugh, 2012
- Amara shinanensis (Habu, 1953)
- Amara shirazica Hejkal, 2008
- Amara shogulaensis Hieke, 1997
- Amara sichotana Lafer, 1978
- Amara sicula Dejean, 1831
- Amara sifanica Tschitscherine, 1894
- Amara sifanicoides Hieke, 2010
- Amara sikkimensis Andrewes, 1930
- Amara silfverbergi Hieke, 1996
- Amara silvestrii Baliani, 1937
- Amara simikotensis Hieke, 2002
- Amara similata (Gyllenhal, 1810)
- Amara simplex Dejean, 1828
- Amara simplicidens A. Morawitz, 1863
- Amara singularis Tschitscherine, 1894
- Amara sinuaticollis A. Morawitz, 1862
- Amara sinuosa (Casey, 1918)
- Amara skopini Hieke, 1976
- Amara sodalicia Casey, 1924
- Amara sogdiana (Kryzhanovskij, 1974)
- Amara sollicita Pantel, 1888
- Amara solskyi (Heyden, 1880)
- Amara somoni Jedlicka, 1968
- Amara songarica Putzeys, 1866
- Amara spectabilis Schaum, 1858
- Amara splendens Andrewes, 1926
- Amara spreta Dejean, 1831
- Amara spuria Lindroth, 1968
- Amara strandi Lutshnik, 1933
- Amara strenua Zimmermann, 1832
- Amara stricticeps Baliani, 1932
- Amara stulta Lutshnik, 1935
- Amara subconvexa Putzeys, 1865
- Amara subdepressa (Putzeys, 1866)
- Amara sublimis Andrewes, 1930
- Amara sublustris Tschitscherine, 1898
- Amara subplanata (Putzeys, 1866)
- Amara sundukowi Hieke, 2002
- Amara superans Wollaston, 1854
- Amara susamyrensis Hieke, 1988
- Amara szekessyi Jedlicka, 1953
- Amara tachypoda Tschitscherine, 1898
- Amara taguensis Hieke, 2005
- Amara taiwanica Hieke, 1999
- Amara taniantawengensis Hieke, 2005
- Amara tartariae (Bates, 1878)
- Amara taurica (Motschulsky, 1844)
- Amara tenax Casey, 1918
- Amara tenebrionella (Bates, 1882)
- Amara termaberensis Hieke, 2007
- Amara texana (Putzeys, 1866)
- Amara thibetana Tschitscherine, 1894
- Amara thoracica Hayward, 1908
- Amara thorongiensis Hieke, 1990
- Amara tibialis (Paykull, 1798)
- Amara torrida (Panzer, 1796)
- Amara tragbaliensis Hieke, 1990
- Amara transberingiensis Hieke, 2002
- Amara transiliensis (Kryzhanovskij, 1974)
- Amara tricuspidata Dejean, 1831
- Amara tschitscherinella Hieke, 1990
- Amara tumida A. Morawitz, 1862
- Amara tuntalashanica Hieke, 2002
- Amara turbata Casey, 1918
- Amara turcica Hieke, 1976
- Amara turcmenica Tschitscherine, 1894
- Amara turkestana (Kryzhanovskij, 1974)
- Amara uhligi Holdhaus, 1904
- Amara ussuriensis Lutshnik, 1935
- Amara vagans Tschitscherine, 1897
- Amara validipes (Tschitscherine, 1888)
- Amara validula Tschitscherine, 1898
- Amara vecors Tschitscherine, 1899
- Amara violacea Motschulsky, 1844
- Amara viridescens Reitter, 1883
- Amara vivesi (Jeanne, 1985)
- Amara vixdentata (Tanaka, 1959)
- Amara vlasovi Kryzhanovskij, 1962
- Amara volatilis (Casey, 1918)
- Amara walterheinzi Hieke, 1988
- Amara weiperti Hieke, 1997
- Amara weiratheri Baliani, 1935
- Amara wengdaensis Hieke, 2010
- Amara wittmeri Hieke, 1981
- Amara wrasei Hieke, 1988
- Amara xueshanica Hieke, 2006
- Amara yangpachensis Hieke, 1997
- Amara yasujensis Hejkal, 2008
- Amara yeti Hieke, 2002
- Amara yulongensis Hieke, 2005
- Amara yupeiyuae Hieke, 2000
- Amara yushuana Hieke, 2012
- Amara yushuensis Hieke, 2003
- Amara zagrosensis (Morvan, 1973)
- Amara zhanglaensis Hieke, 2012
- Amara zhegushanica Hieke, 2005
- Amara zhongdianica Hieke, 1997
- † Amara boryslavica Lomnicki, 1894
- † Amara cockerelli Wickham, 1912
- † Amara danae Scudder, 1900
- † Amara forsteri Handlirsch, 1906
- † Amara pinguicula Heer, 1862
- † Amara powellii Scudder, 1900
- † Amara primigenia Heer, 1862
- † Amara princeps Heer, 1862
- † Amara procera Forster, 1891
- † Amara revocata Scudder, 1900
- † Amara sterilis Scudder, 1900
- † Amara veterata Scudder, 1900
