= Amara rectangula =

Scientific classification
- Kingdom: Animalia
- Phylum: Arthropoda
- Class: Insecta
- Order: Coleoptera
- Suborder: Adephaga
- Family: Carabidae
- Subfamily: Pterostichinae
- Tribe: Zabrini
- Subtribe: Amarina
- Genus: Amara
- Species: A. rectangula

Binomial name
- Amara rectangula LeConte, 1855

Synonyms
- Amara celiana Stehr, 1949

Species of beetle

Amara rectangula is a species of ground beetle in the family Carabidae, found in the United States and Mexico.

== Subspecies ==
These two subspecies belong to the species Amara rectangula:

- Amara rectangula ciudadensis (Bates, 1891)
- Amara rectangula rectangula LeConte, 1855
