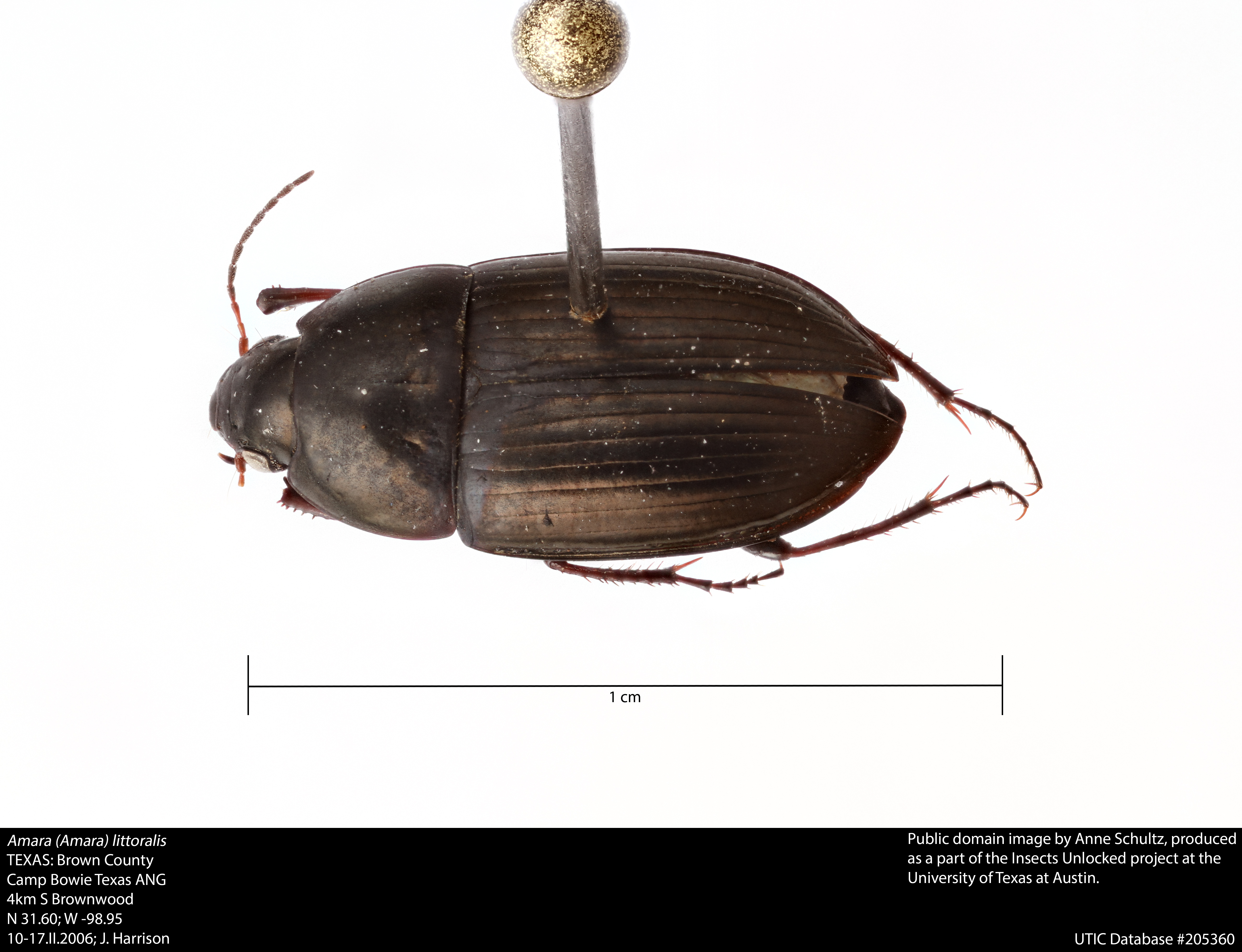

Scientific classification
- Kingdom: Animalia
- Phylum: Arthropoda
- Class: Insecta
- Order: Coleoptera
- Suborder: Adephaga
- Family: Carabidae
- Genus: Amara
- Species: A. littoralis

Binomial name
- Amara littoralis Dejean, 1828 (Note: The specific name is also sometimes attributed to Mannerheim (1843), as he was the first to describe the species; however, Dejean (1828) published the name earlier as a junior synonym of A. plebeja according to Yves Bousquet (2012).)

Synonyms
- Amara acuminata Casey, 1918 (nec Paykull, 1798); Amara acuticauda Casey, 1924; Amara convergens Casey, 1924; Amara fallax LeConte, 1848; Amara hesperia Casey, 1918; Amara keeni Casey, 1918; Amara lacustrina Casey, 1918; Amara laurana Casey, 1918; Amara mystica Casey, 1918; Amara oodiformis Casey, 1924; Amara pullmani Casey, 1924; Amara teres Notman, 1921 (?)

= Amara littoralis =

Species of beetle

Amara littoralis is a species of beetle of the genus Amara in the family Carabidae. It is native to parts of Asia.
