= Amara pomona =

Scientific classification
- Kingdom: Animalia
- Phylum: Arthropoda
- Class: Insecta
- Order: Coleoptera
- Suborder: Adephaga
- Family: Carabidae
- Subfamily: Pterostichinae
- Tribe: Zabrini
- Subtribe: Amarina
- Genus: Amara
- Species: A. pomona

Binomial name
- Amara pomona Casey, 1918

Synonyms
- Amara americana Csiki, 1929

Species of beetle

Amara pomona is a species of ground beetle in the family Carabidae, native to the United States.
