= Amara fritzhiekei =

Scientific classification
- Kingdom: Animalia
- Phylum: Arthropoda
- Class: Insecta
- Order: Coleoptera
- Suborder: Adephaga
- Family: Carabidae
- Subfamily: Pterostichinae
- Tribe: Zabrini
- Subtribe: Amarina
- Genus: Amara
- Species: A. fritzhiekei

Binomial name
- Amara fritzhiekei (Sundukov, 2013)

Synonyms
- Amara amplipennis Baliani, 1943

Species of beetle

Amara fritzhiekei is a species of ground beetle in the family Carabidae, found in China, Russia, Mongolia, and North Korea.
