= Amara ellipsis =

Scientific classification
- Kingdom: Animalia
- Phylum: Arthropoda
- Class: Insecta
- Order: Coleoptera
- Suborder: Adephaga
- Family: Carabidae
- Genus: Amara
- Species: A. ellipsis

Binomial name
- Amara ellipsis (Casey, 1918)

Species of beetle

Amara ellipsis is a species of seed-eating ground beetle in the family Carabidae. It is found in North America.
