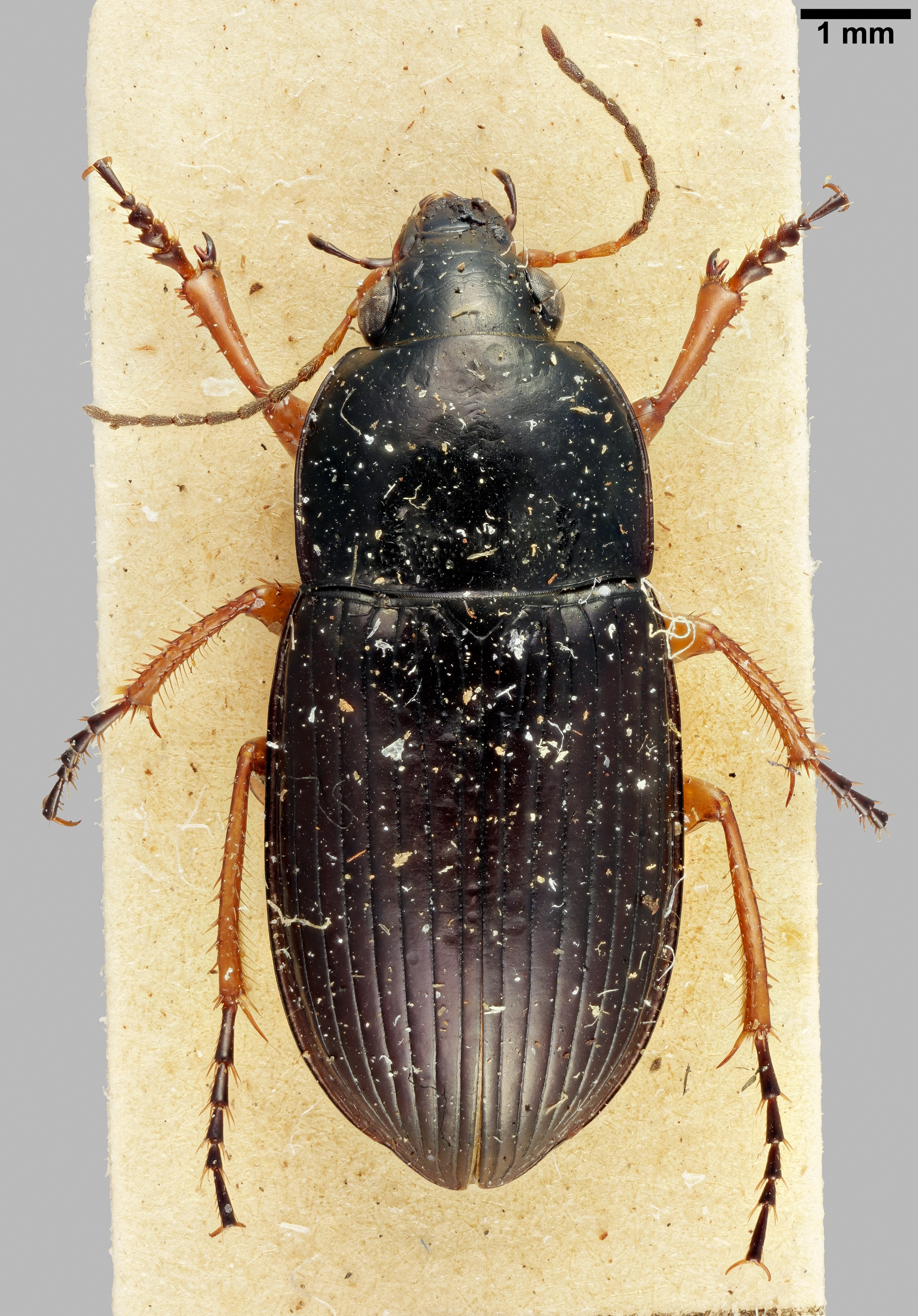

Scientific classification
- Kingdom: Animalia
- Phylum: Arthropoda
- Class: Insecta
- Order: Coleoptera
- Suborder: Adephaga
- Family: Carabidae
- Genus: Amara
- Species: A. chaudoiri

Binomial name
- Amara chaudoiri Schaum, 1858

= Amara chaudoiri =

Species of beetle

Amara chaudoiri is a species of beetle of the genus Amara in the family Carabidae.

== Subspecies ==
There are three subspecies of A. chaudoiri:

- Amara chaudoiri chaudoiri Schaum, 1858
- Amara chaudoiri incognita Fassati, 1946
- Amara chaudoiri transcaucasiens Hieke, 1970
