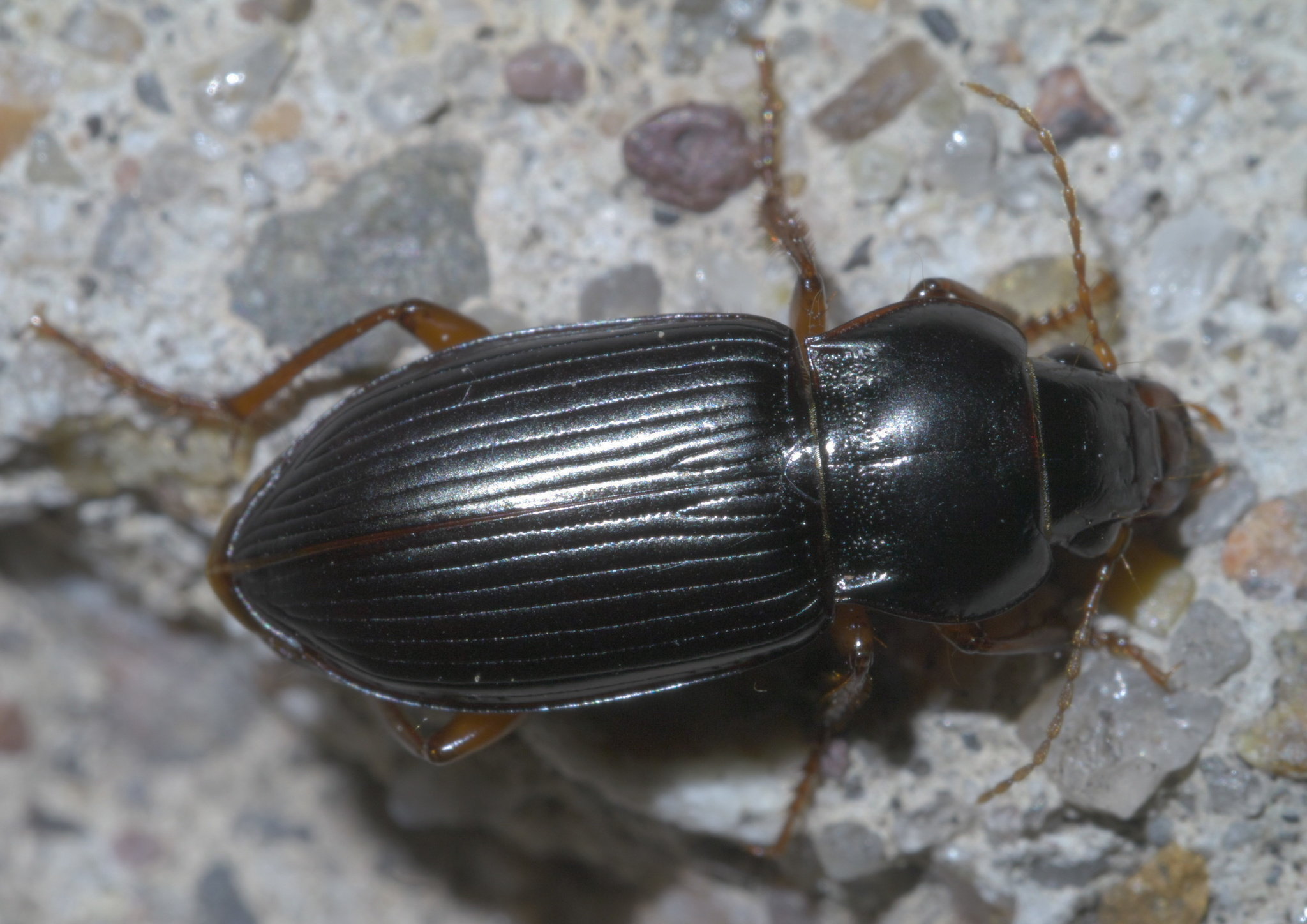
- Amara carinata, Kansas

Scientific classification
- Kingdom: Animalia
- Phylum: Arthropoda
- Class: Insecta
- Order: Coleoptera
- Suborder: Adephaga
- Family: Carabidae
- Genus: Amara
- Species: A. carinata

Binomial name
- Amara carinata (LeConte, 1848)

Synonyms
- Curtonotus adstrictus Putzeys, 1866; Curtonotus carinatus LeConte, 1847; Curtonotus catenulatus Casey, 1918; Curtonotus concretus Casey, 1918; Curtonotus gilvipes Casey, 1924; Curtonotus laticollis LeConte, 1847; Curtonotus spadiceus Casey, 1918

= Amara carinata =

Species of beetle

Amara carinata is a species of ground beetle of the genus Amara, found in North America.
