= Amara apachensis =

Scientific classification
- Kingdom: Animalia
- Phylum: Arthropoda
- Class: Insecta
- Order: Coleoptera
- Suborder: Adephaga
- Family: Carabidae
- Genus: Amara
- Species: A. apachensis

Binomial name
- Amara apachensis Casey, 1884

Synonyms
- Bradytus specularis Casey, 1918; Celia amplipennis Casey, 1918; Celia decora Notman, 1922; Celia patula Casey, 1918

Species of beetle

Amara apachensis is a species of beetle of the genus Amara in the family Carabidae.
