= Amara pseudobrunnea =

Scientific classification
- Kingdom: Animalia
- Phylum: Arthropoda
- Class: Insecta
- Order: Coleoptera
- Suborder: Adephaga
- Family: Carabidae
- Genus: Amara
- Species: A. pseudobrunnea

Binomial name
- Amara pseudobrunnea Lindroth, 1968

Species of beetle

Amara pseudobrunnea is a species of seed-eating ground beetle in the family Carabidae.

== Distribution ==
It is found in North America.
