= Amara hyperborea =

Scientific classification
- Kingdom: Animalia
- Phylum: Arthropoda
- Class: Insecta
- Order: Coleoptera
- Suborder: Adephaga
- Family: Carabidae
- Genus: Amara
- Species: A. hyperborea

Binomial name
- Amara hyperborea Dejean, 1831

Synonyms
- Harpalus simulans J.R. Sahlberg, 1880; Curtonotus imperfectus Brown, 1930

Species of beetle

Amara hyperborea is a species of seed-eating ground beetle in the subfamily Harpalinae. It is found in northeastern China, southern Mongolia, as well as Finland, Canada and the United States.
