= Amara aurichalcea =

Scientific classification
- Kingdom: Animalia
- Phylum: Arthropoda
- Clade: Pancrustacea
- Class: Insecta
- Order: Coleoptera
- Suborder: Adephaga
- Family: Carabidae
- Genus: Amara
- Species: A. aurichalcea

Binomial name
- Amara aurichalcea Germar, 1823

Species of beetle

Amara aurichalcea is a species of beetle of the genus Amara in the family Carabidae.
