= Amara latior =

Scientific classification
- Kingdom: Animalia
- Phylum: Arthropoda
- Class: Insecta
- Order: Coleoptera
- Suborder: Adephaga
- Family: Carabidae
- Genus: Amara
- Species: A. latior

Binomial name
- Amara latior (Kirby, 1837)

Synonyms
- Amara libera LeConte, 1855; Amara oregona LeConte, 1855; Amara relicta (Casey, 1918); Bradytus deceptus Casey, 1918; Bradytus humphreysi Casey, 1918; Bradytus laevistriatus Putzeys, 1866; Bradytus relictus Casey, 1918; Curtonotus latior Kirby, 1837

Species of beetle

Amara latior is a North American species of seed-eating ground beetle in the family Carabidae.
