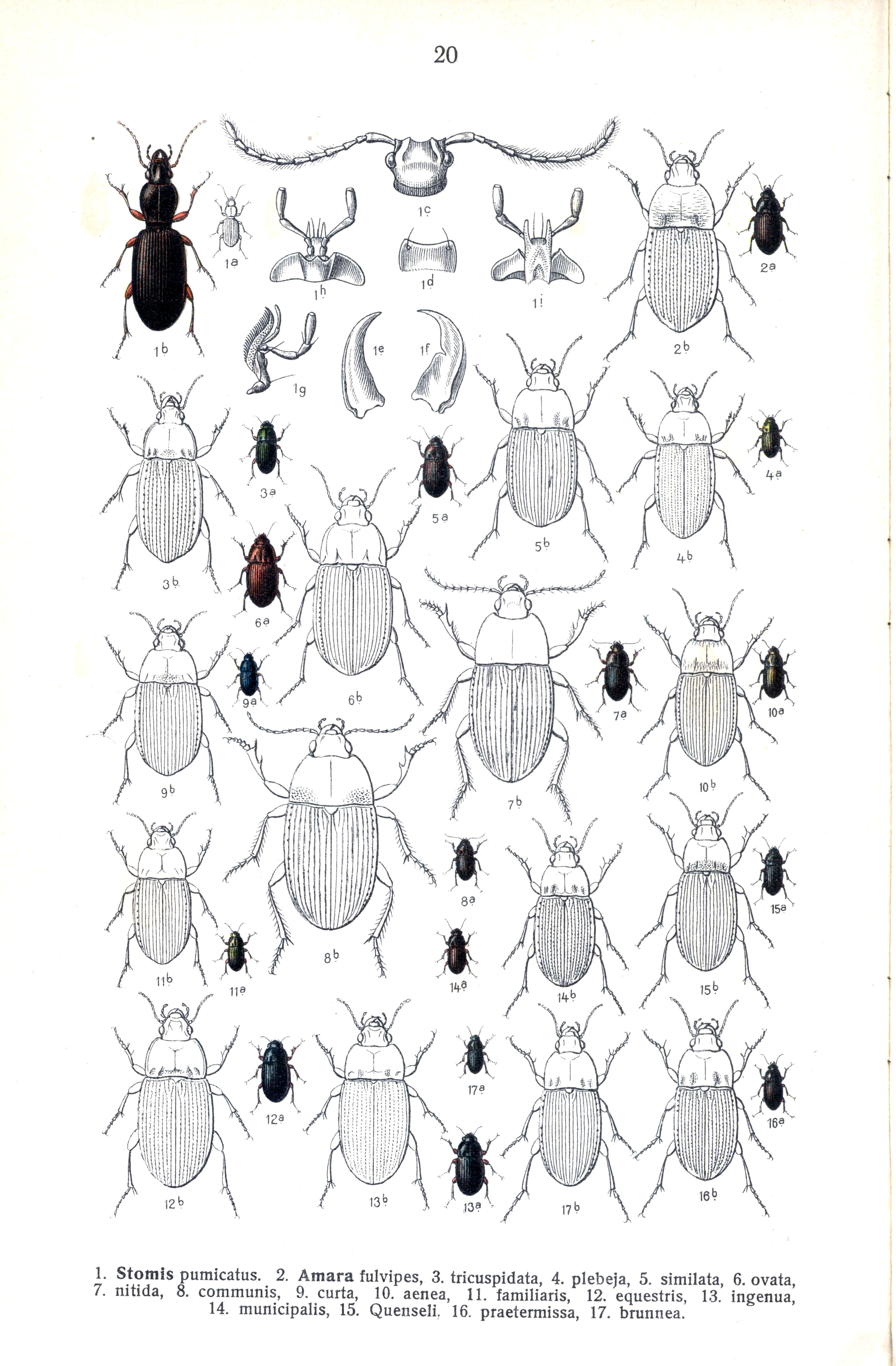

Scientific classification
- Kingdom: Animalia
- Phylum: Arthropoda
- Class: Insecta
- Order: Coleoptera
- Suborder: Adephaga
- Family: Carabidae
- Genus: Amara
- Species: A. praetermissa

Binomial name
- Amara praetermissa (C.R. Sahlberg, 1827)

= Amara praetermissa =

Species of beetle

Amara praetermissa is a species of ground beetle native to Europe.
