= Amara musculis =

Scientific classification
- Kingdom: Animalia
- Phylum: Arthropoda
- Class: Insecta
- Order: Coleoptera
- Suborder: Adephaga
- Family: Carabidae
- Genus: Amara
- Species: A. musculis

Binomial name
- Amara musculis (Say, 1823)

Synonyms
- Feronia musculis Say, 1823; Amara minnesotana (Casey, 1924); Amara pimalis (Casey, 1918)

Species of beetle

Amara musculis is a species of seed-eating ground beetle in the family Carabidae. It is found in North America.

Amara musculis measure 3.9–6.5 mm (0.2–0.3 in).
