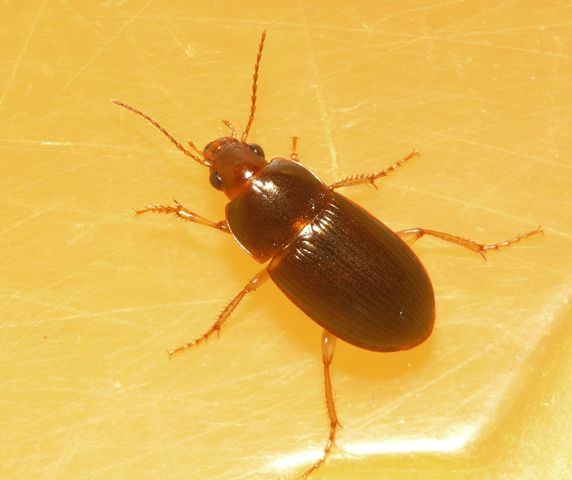

Scientific classification
- Kingdom: Animalia
- Phylum: Arthropoda
- Class: Insecta
- Order: Coleoptera
- Suborder: Adephaga
- Family: Carabidae
- Genus: Amara
- Species: A. bifrons

Binomial name
- Amara bifrons (Gyllenhal, 1810)

Synonyms
- Harpalus bifrons Gyllenhal, 1810

= Amara bifrons =

Species of beetle

Amara bifrons is a species of beetle of the genus Amara in the family Carabidae.It is native to Europe.
