= Amara interstitialis =

Scientific classification
- Kingdom: Animalia
- Phylum: Arthropoda
- Class: Insecta
- Order: Coleoptera
- Suborder: Adephaga
- Family: Carabidae
- Genus: Amara
- Species: A. interstitialis

Binomial name
- Amara interstitialis Dejean, 1828

Species of beetle

Amara interstitialis is a species of seed-eating ground beetle in the family Carabidae. It is found in Europe and Northern Asia (excluding China) and North America.
