= Amara blanchardi =

Scientific classification
- Kingdom: Animalia
- Phylum: Arthropoda
- Clade: Pancrustacea
- Class: Insecta
- Order: Coleoptera
- Suborder: Adephaga
- Family: Carabidae
- Genus: Amara
- Species: A. blanchardi

Binomial name
- Amara blanchardi Hayward, 1908

Synonyms
- Curtonotus sponsor Casey, 1918; Curtonotus tartareus Casey, 1918

Species of beetle

Amara blanchardi is a species of beetle of the genus Amara in the family Carabidae. It is native to North America.
