= Amara browni =

Scientific classification
- Kingdom: Animalia
- Phylum: Arthropoda
- Class: Insecta
- Order: Coleoptera
- Suborder: Adephaga
- Family: Carabidae
- Genus: Amara
- Species: A. browni

Binomial name
- Amara browni Lindroth, 1968

Species of beetle

Amara browni is a species of beetle of the genus Amara in the family Carabidae.
