= Amara angustata =

Scientific classification
- Kingdom: Animalia
- Phylum: Arthropoda
- Class: Insecta
- Order: Coleoptera
- Suborder: Adephaga
- Family: Carabidae
- Genus: Amara
- Species: A. angustata

Binomial name
- Amara angustata (Say, 1823)

Synonyms
- Amara indistincta Haldeman, 1843; Feronia angustata Say, 1823

Species of beetle

Amara angustata is a species of beetle of the genus Amara in the family Carabidae.
