= Amara belfragei =

Scientific classification
- Kingdom: Animalia
- Phylum: Arthropoda
- Clade: Pancrustacea
- Class: Insecta
- Order: Coleoptera
- Suborder: Adephaga
- Family: Carabidae
- Genus: Amara
- Species: A. belfragei

Binomial name
- Amara belfragei Horn, 1892

Species of beetle

Amara belfragei is a species of beetle of the genus Amara in the family Carabidae.
