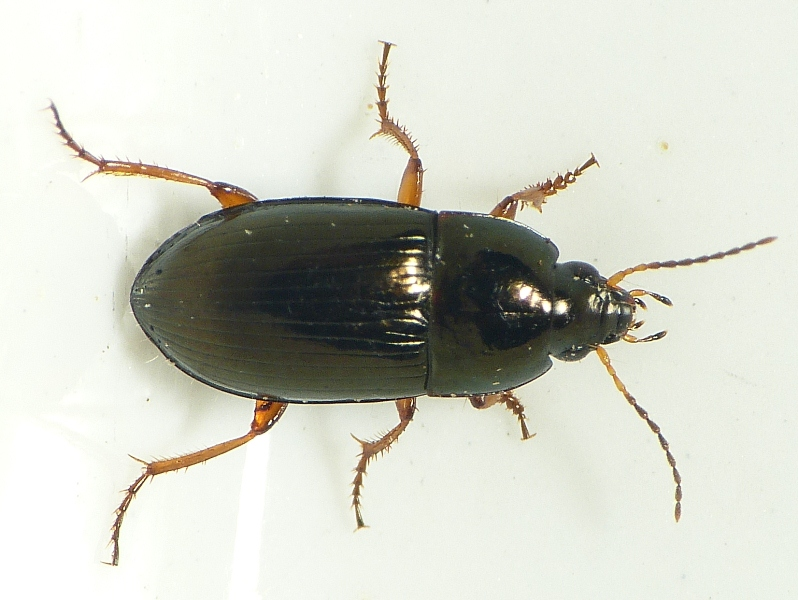

Scientific classification
- Kingdom: Animalia
- Phylum: Arthropoda
- Class: Insecta
- Order: Coleoptera
- Suborder: Adephaga
- Family: Carabidae
- Genus: Amara
- Species: A. familiaris

Binomial name
- Amara familiaris (Duftschmid, 1812)

Synonyms
- Amara humilis Casey, 1918; Carabus familiaris Duftschmid, 1812

= Amara familiaris =

Species of beetle

Amara familiaris is a species of ground beetle native to Europe.
