= Amara bokori =

Scientific classification
- Kingdom: Animalia
- Phylum: Arthropoda
- Class: Insecta
- Order: Coleoptera
- Suborder: Adephaga
- Family: Carabidae
- Genus: Amara
- Species: A. bokori

Binomial name
- Amara bokori Csiki, 1929

Synonyms
- Amara sahlbergi Poppius, 1906

Species of beetle

Amara bokori is a species of beetle of the genus Amara in the family Carabidae.
