= Amara colvillensis =

Scientific classification
- Kingdom: Animalia
- Phylum: Arthropoda
- Class: Insecta
- Order: Coleoptera
- Suborder: Adephaga
- Family: Carabidae
- Genus: Amara
- Species: A. colvillensis

Binomial name
- Amara colvillensis Lindroth, 1968

Species of beetle

Amara colvillensis is a species of beetle of the genus Amara in the family Carabidae.
