= Amara aurata =

Scientific classification
- Kingdom: Animalia
- Phylum: Arthropoda
- Class: Insecta
- Order: Coleoptera
- Suborder: Adephaga
- Family: Carabidae
- Genus: Amara
- Species: A. aurata

Binomial name
- Amara aurata Dejean, 1828

Synonyms
- Amara imitatrix G.H. Horn, 1892; Celia angustior Casey, 1918; Celia clementina Casey, 1918; Celia evanida Casey, 1918; Celia farallonica Casey, 1918; Celia fragilis Casey, 1924; Celia govanensis Casey, 1924; Celia hilaris Casey, 1918; Celia jacinto Casey, 1918; Celia proba Casey, 1918; Celia rotundiceps Casey, 1918

Species of beetle

Amara aurata is a species of beetle of the genus Amara in the family Carabidae.
