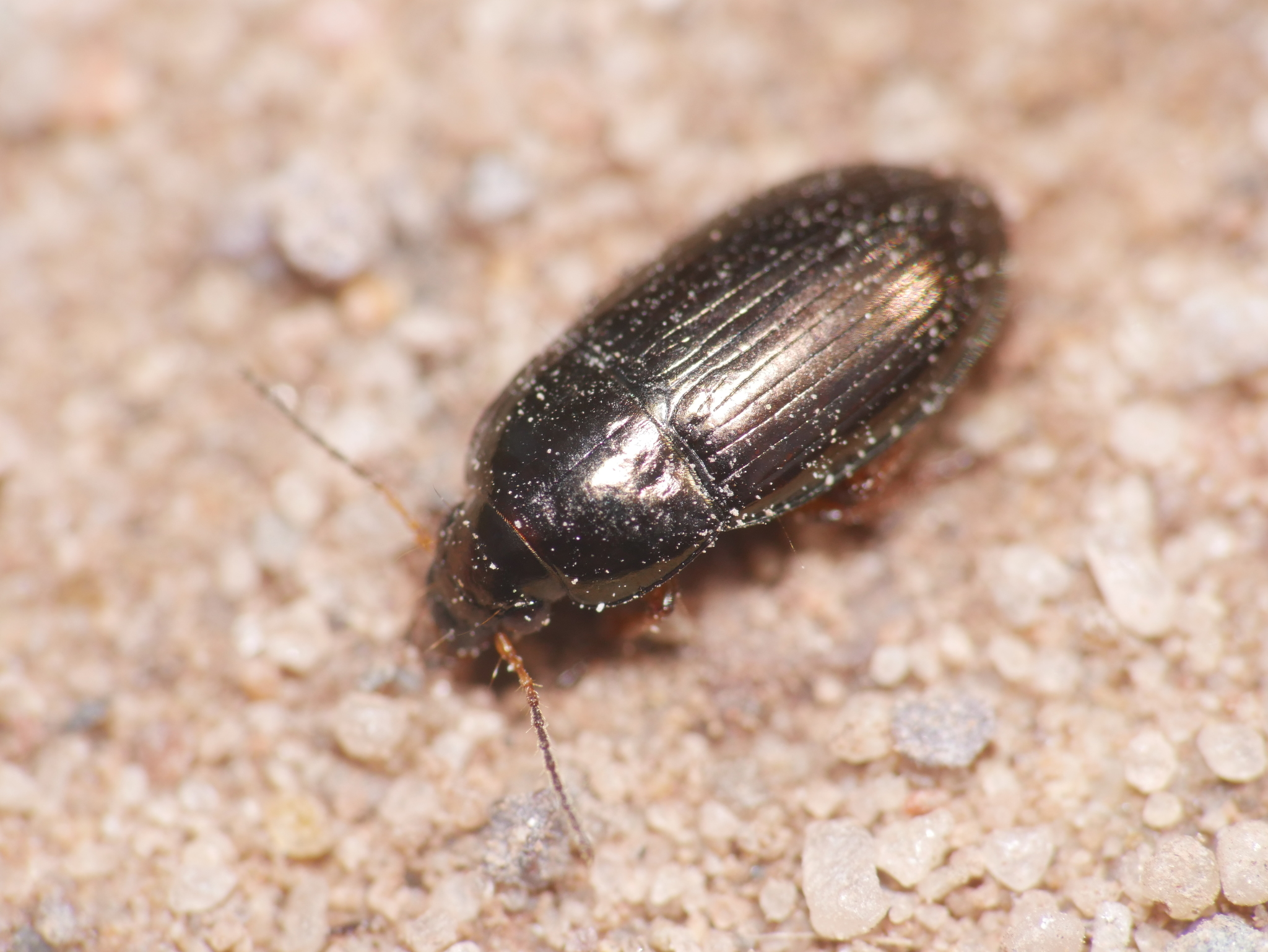

Scientific classification
- Kingdom: Animalia
- Phylum: Arthropoda
- Class: Insecta
- Order: Coleoptera
- Suborder: Adephaga
- Family: Carabidae
- Genus: Amara
- Species: A. anthobia

Binomial name
- Amara anthobia A.Villa et G.B.Villa, 1833

= Amara anthobia =

Species of beetle

Amara anthobia is a species of ground beetle within the genus Amara in the family Carabidae.
