= Amara deparca =

Scientific classification
- Kingdom: Animalia
- Phylum: Arthropoda
- Class: Insecta
- Order: Coleoptera
- Suborder: Adephaga
- Family: Carabidae
- Genus: Amara
- Species: A. deparca

Binomial name
- Amara deparca (Say, 1830)

Synonyms
- Amara bowditchi Hayward, 1908; Curtonotus substriatus Putzeys, 1866; Feronia deparca Say, 1830

Species of beetle

Amara deparca is a species of beetle of the genus Amara in the family Carabidae.
