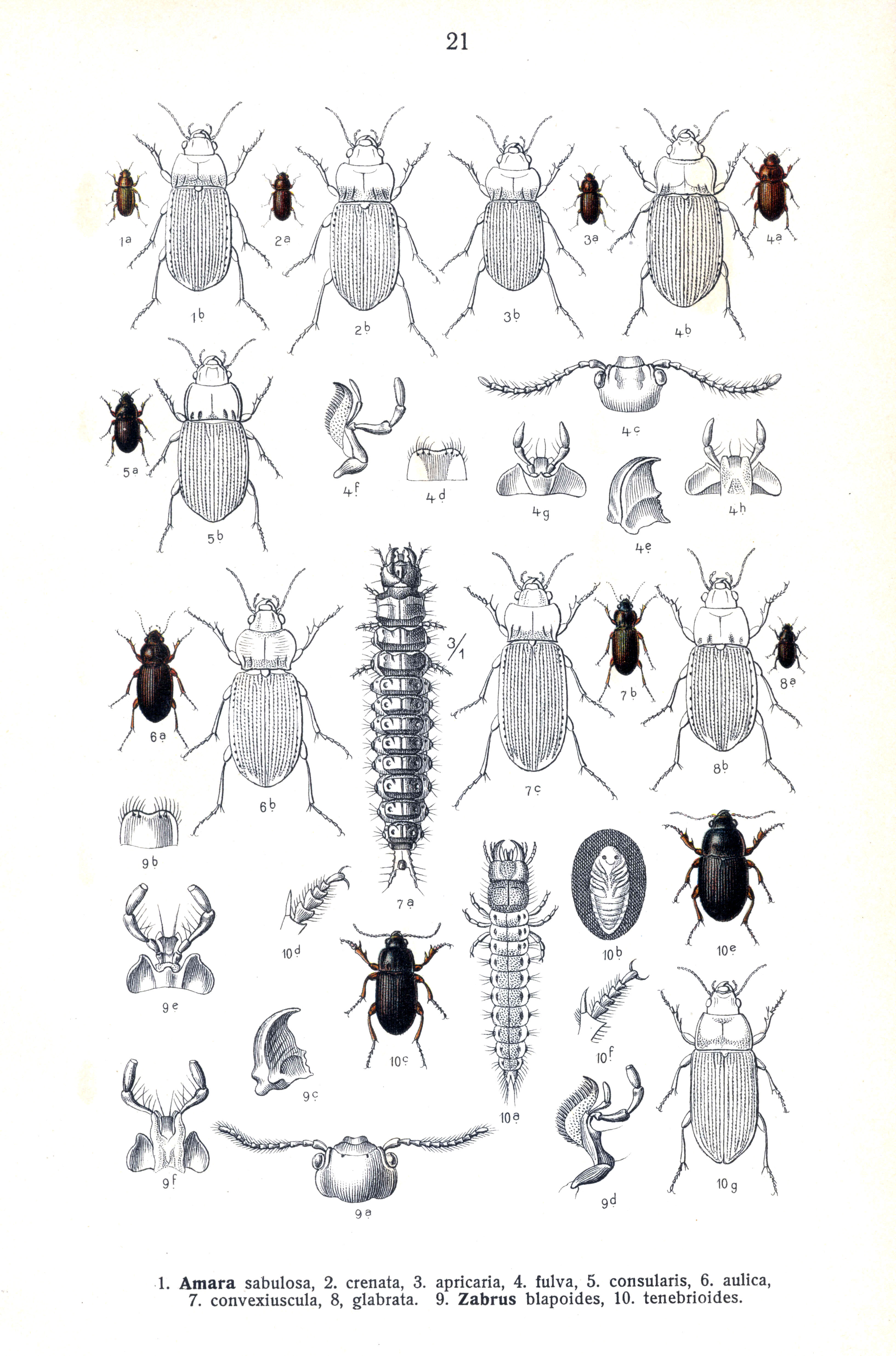

Scientific classification
- Kingdom: Animalia
- Phylum: Arthropoda
- Class: Insecta
- Order: Coleoptera
- Suborder: Adephaga
- Family: Carabidae
- Genus: Amara
- Species: A. consularis

Binomial name
- Amara consularis Duftschmid, 1812

= Amara consularis =

Species of beetle

Amara consularis is a species of ground beetle native to Europe.
