= Amara chalcea =

Scientific classification
- Kingdom: Animalia
- Phylum: Arthropoda
- Class: Insecta
- Order: Coleoptera
- Suborder: Adephaga
- Family: Carabidae
- Genus: Amara
- Species: A. chalcea

Binomial name
- Amara chalcea Dejean, 1828

Synonyms
- Amara jucunda Csiki, 1929; Celia corvina Casey, 1918; Celia impunctata Putzeys, 1867; Celia maneei Casey, 1924; Celia pinorum Casey, 1918; Celia schotti Casey, 1918; Celia sodalis Casey, 1918; Celia sphaerops Casey, 1918

Species of beetle

Amara chalcea is a species of beetle of the genus Amara in the family Carabidae.
