= Amara armeniaca =

Scientific classification
- Kingdom: Animalia
- Phylum: Arthropoda
- Class: Insecta
- Order: Coleoptera
- Suborder: Adephaga
- Family: Carabidae
- Genus: Amara
- Species: A. armeniaca

Binomial name
- Amara armeniaca (Motschulsky, 1839)

Species of beetle

Amara armeniaca is a species of beetle in the family Carabidae. It is found in East Europe and further east in the Palearctic realm.
