= Amara pennsylvanica =

Scientific classification
- Kingdom: Animalia
- Phylum: Arthropoda
- Class: Insecta
- Order: Coleoptera
- Suborder: Adephaga
- Family: Carabidae
- Genus: Amara
- Species: A. pennsylvanica

Binomial name
- Amara pennsylvanica Hayward, 1908

Species of beetle

Amara pennsylvanica is a species of seed-eating ground beetle in the family Carabidae. It is found in North America.
