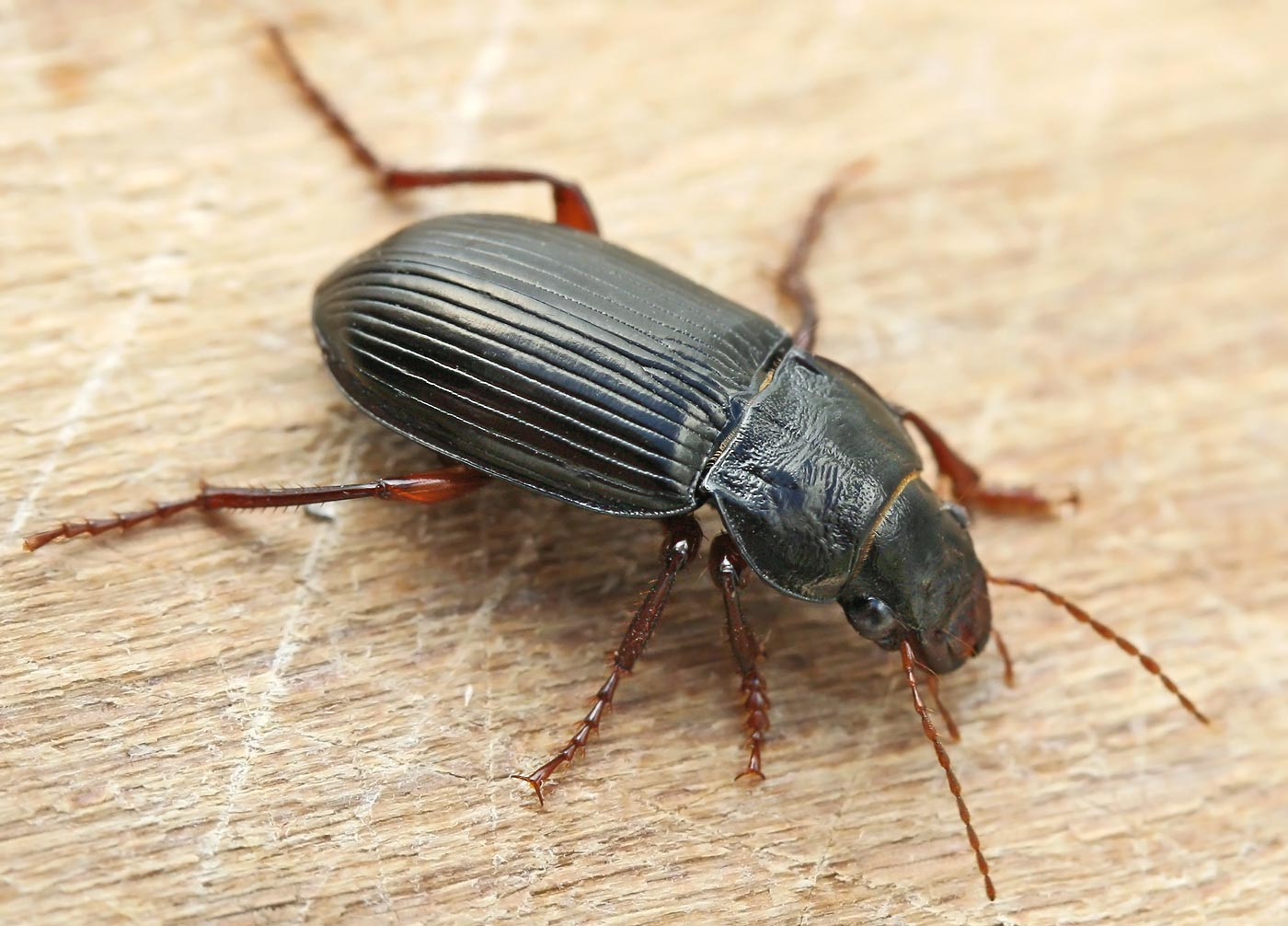

Scientific classification
- Kingdom: Animalia
- Phylum: Arthropoda
- Class: Insecta
- Order: Coleoptera
- Suborder: Adephaga
- Family: Carabidae
- Genus: Amara
- Species: A. aulica

Binomial name
- Amara aulica (Panzer, 1797)

Synonyms
- Carabus aulicus Panzer, 1796; Carabus ruficornis DeGeer, 1774

= Amara aulica =

Species of beetle

Amara aulica is a species of beetle of the genus Amara in the Harpalinae subfamily. It is native to Europe.
