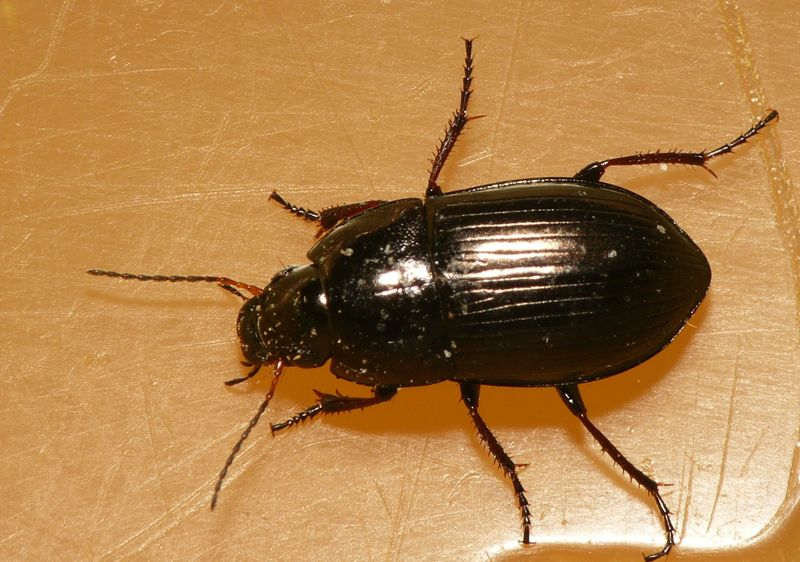

Scientific classification
- Kingdom: Animalia
- Phylum: Arthropoda
- Class: Insecta
- Order: Coleoptera
- Suborder: Adephaga
- Family: Carabidae
- Genus: Amara
- Species: A. similata

Binomial name
- Amara similata (Gyllenhal, 1810)

Synonyms
- Harpalus similatus Gyllenhal, 1810

= Amara similata =

Species of beetle

Amara similata is a species of ground beetle native to Europe.
