= Amara castanea =

Scientific classification
- Kingdom: Animalia
- Phylum: Arthropoda
- Clade: Pancrustacea
- Class: Insecta
- Order: Coleoptera
- Suborder: Adephaga
- Family: Carabidae
- Genus: Amara
- Species: A. castanea

Binomial name
- Amara castanea (Putzeys, 1866)

Species of beetle

Amara castanea is a species of beetle of the genus Amara in the family Carabidae.
