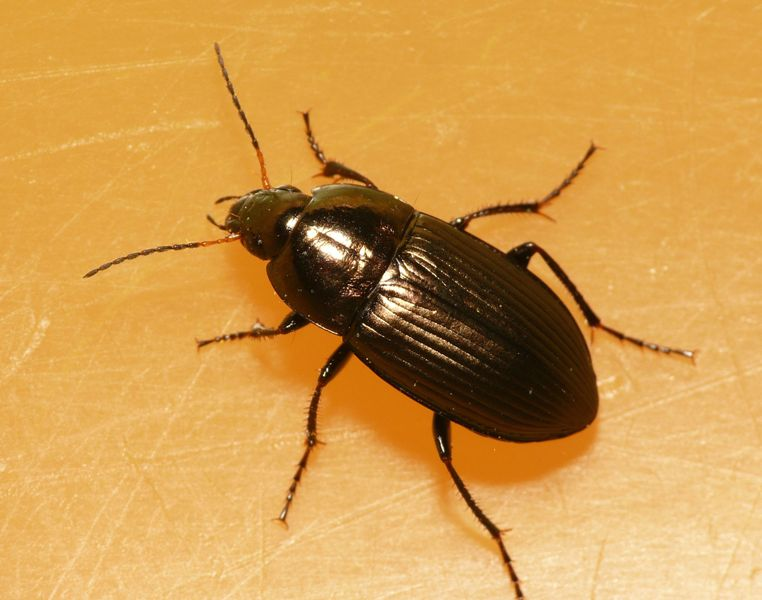

Scientific classification
- Kingdom: Animalia
- Phylum: Arthropoda
- Clade: Pancrustacea
- Class: Insecta
- Order: Coleoptera
- Suborder: Adephaga
- Family: Carabidae
- Genus: Amara
- Species: A. convexior

Binomial name
- Amara convexior Stephens, 1828

= Amara convexior =

Species of beetle

Amara convexior is a species of ground beetle native to Europe.
