= Amara biarticulata =

Scientific classification
- Kingdom: Animalia
- Phylum: Arthropoda
- Class: Insecta
- Order: Coleoptera
- Suborder: Adephaga
- Family: Carabidae
- Genus: Amara
- Species: A. biarticulata

Binomial name
- Amara biarticulata Motschulsky, 1845

Species of beetle

Amara biarticulata is a species of beetle in the family Carabidae. It is found in East Europe and further east in the Palearctic realm.
