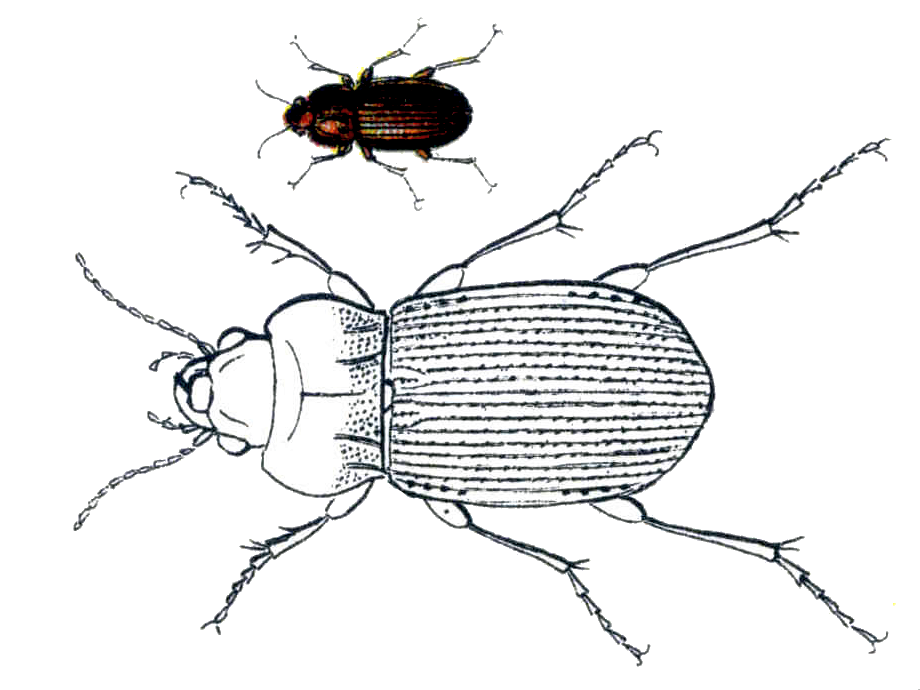

Scientific classification
- Kingdom: Animalia
- Phylum: Arthropoda
- Clade: Pancrustacea
- Class: Insecta
- Order: Coleoptera
- Suborder: Adephaga
- Family: Carabidae
- Genus: Amara
- Species: A. apricaria

Binomial name
- Amara apricaria (Paykull, 1790)

Synonyms
- Amara putzeysiana Csiki, 1929; Amara putzeysii G.H. Horn, 1875; Amara pygmea Couper, 1865; Carabus apricarius Paykull, 1790

= Amara apricaria =

Species of beetle

Amara apricaria is a species of beetle of the genus Amara in the family Carabidae. It is native to Europe.
