= Amara alpestris =

Scientific classification
- Kingdom: Animalia
- Phylum: Arthropoda
- Class: Insecta
- Order: Coleoptera
- Suborder: Adephaga
- Family: Carabidae
- Genus: Amara
- Species: A. alpestris

Binomial name
- Amara alpestris A. Villa & G.B. Villa, 1833

Species of beetle

Amara alpestris is a species of beetle of the genus Amara in the family Carabidae that is native to Asia.

== Subspecies ==
There are seven subspecies of A. alpestris:

- Amara alpestris alpestris A. Villa & G.B. Villa, 1833
- Amara alpestris baldensis K. & J. Daniel, 1898
- Amara alpestris bonomii Holdhaus, 1942
- Amara alpestris dolomitana K. & J. Daniel, 1898
- Amara alpestris interjecta Holdhaus, 1942
- Amara alpestris munda Holdhaus, 1942
- Amara alpestris pasubiana K. & J. Daniel, 1898
