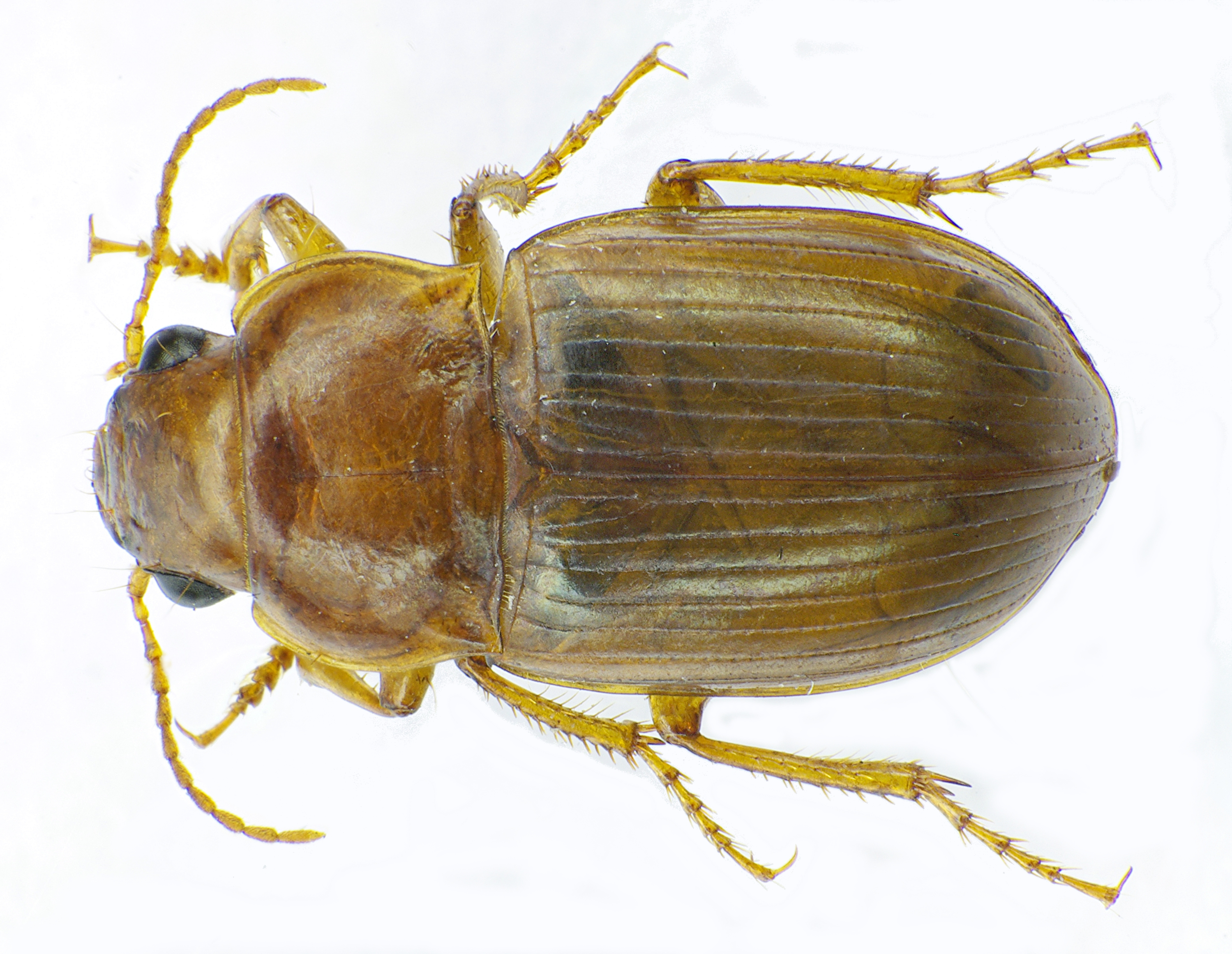

Scientific classification
- Kingdom: Animalia
- Phylum: Arthropoda
- Class: Insecta
- Order: Coleoptera
- Suborder: Adephaga
- Family: Carabidae
- Genus: Amara
- Species: A. fulva

Binomial name
- Amara fulva (O. F. Müller, 1776)

Synonyms
- Carabus fulvus O.F. Müller, 1776; Carabus concolor Olivier, 1795

= Amara fulva =

Species of beetle

Amara fulva is a species of ground beetle native to Europe.
