= Amara brevicollis =

Scientific classification
- Kingdom: Animalia
- Phylum: Arthropoda
- Clade: Pancrustacea
- Class: Insecta
- Order: Coleoptera
- Suborder: Adephaga
- Family: Carabidae
- Genus: Amara
- Species: A. brevicollis

Binomial name
- Amara brevicollis (Chaudoir, 1850)

Species of beetle

Amara brevicollis is a species of beetle of the genus Amara in the family Carabidae.
