= Amara neoscotica =

Scientific classification
- Kingdom: Animalia
- Phylum: Arthropoda
- Clade: Pancrustacea
- Class: Insecta
- Order: Coleoptera
- Suborder: Adephaga
- Family: Carabidae
- Genus: Amara
- Species: A. neoscotica

Binomial name
- Amara neoscotica Casey, 1924

Species of beetle

Amara neoscotica is a species of seed-eating ground beetle in the family Carabidae. It is found in North America.
