= Amara sinuosa =

Scientific classification
- Kingdom: Animalia
- Phylum: Arthropoda
- Class: Insecta
- Order: Coleoptera
- Suborder: Adephaga
- Family: Carabidae
- Genus: Amara
- Species: A. sinuosa

Binomial name
- Amara sinuosa (Casey, 1918)

Synonyms
- Acrodon subaenea LeConte, 1850; Amara subaenescens Csiki, 1929; Celia elusa Casey, 1918; Celia hospes Casey, 1918; Celia nupta Casey, 1918; Celia sinuosa Casey, 1918; Celia thoracica Casey, 1918; Isopleurus nitidus Kirby, 1837

Species of beetle

Amara sinuosa is a species of ground beetle in the genus Amara ("seed-eating ground beetles"), in the family Carabidae ("ground beetles"). It is found in North America.
