= Amara impuncticollis =

Scientific classification
- Kingdom: Animalia
- Phylum: Arthropoda
- Class: Insecta
- Order: Coleoptera
- Suborder: Adephaga
- Family: Carabidae
- Genus: Amara
- Species: A. impuncticollis

Binomial name
- Amara impuncticollis (Say, 1823)

Species of beetle

Amara impuncticollis is a species of seed-eating ground beetle in the family Carabidae. It is found in North America.
