= Amara glacialis =

Scientific classification
- Kingdom: Animalia
- Phylum: Arthropoda
- Class: Insecta
- Order: Coleoptera
- Suborder: Adephaga
- Family: Carabidae
- Genus: Amara
- Species: A. glacialis

Binomial name
- Amara glacialis (Mannerheim, 1853)

Species of beetle

Amara glacialis is a species of seed-eating ground beetle in the subfamily Carabinae. It is found in Siberia and North America.
