= Amara aeneopolita =

Scientific classification
- Kingdom: Animalia
- Phylum: Arthropoda
- Class: Insecta
- Order: Coleoptera
- Suborder: Adephaga
- Family: Carabidae
- Genus: Amara
- Species: A. aeneopolita

Binomial name
- Amara aeneopolita Casey, 1918

Species of beetle

Amara aeneopolita is a species of beetle of the genus Amara in the family Carabidae that is native to Asia.
