= Amara basillaris =

Scientific classification
- Kingdom: Animalia
- Phylum: Arthropoda
- Class: Insecta
- Order: Coleoptera
- Suborder: Adephaga
- Family: Carabidae
- Genus: Amara
- Species: A. basillaris

Binomial name
- Amara basillaris (Say, 1823)

Synonyms
- Amara lucidula Dejean, 1828; Amara marylandica Casey, 1884; Feronia basillaris Say, 1823

Species of beetle

Amara basillaris is a species of beetle of the genus Amara in the family Carabidae.
