= Amara confusa =

Scientific classification
- Kingdom: Animalia
- Phylum: Arthropoda
- Class: Insecta
- Order: Coleoptera
- Suborder: Adephaga
- Family: Carabidae
- Genus: Amara
- Species: A. confusa

Binomial name
- Amara confusa LeConte, 1848

Synonyms
- Amara acomana Casey, 1924; Amara castalia Casey, 1918; Amara ebenina Casey, 1918; Amara impedita Casey, 1918; Amara oblongiformis Casey, 1924; Amara protensa Putzeys, 1866; Amara subarctica Casey, 1924; Amara subpunctata LeConte, 1855; Amara viridula Casey, 1924; Celia modulata Casey, 1918

Species of beetle

Amara confusa is a species of beetle of the genus Amara in the family Carabidae. It is found in Idaho.
