= Amara ovata =

- Video

Scientific classification
- Kingdom: Animalia
- Phylum: Arthropoda
- Clade: Pancrustacea
- Class: Insecta
- Order: Coleoptera
- Suborder: Adephaga
- Family: Carabidae
- Genus: Amara
- Species: A. ovata

Binomial name
- Amara ovata (Fabricius, 1792)

Synonyms
- Carabus ovatus Fabricius, 1792

Species of beetle

Amara ovata is a species of ground beetle native to Europe.
