= Amara cupreolata =

Scientific classification
- Kingdom: Animalia
- Phylum: Arthropoda
- Class: Insecta
- Order: Coleoptera
- Suborder: Adephaga
- Family: Carabidae
- Genus: Amara
- Species: A. cupreolata

Binomial name
- Amara cupreolata Putzeys, 1866

Synonyms
- Amara enervis Casey, 1918

Species of beetle

Amara cupreolata is a species of seed-eating ground beetle in the family Carabidae. It is found in North America.
