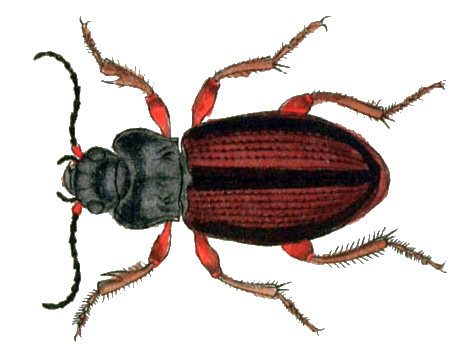

Scientific classification
- Kingdom: Animalia
- Phylum: Arthropoda
- Clade: Pancrustacea
- Class: Insecta
- Order: Coleoptera
- Suborder: Adephaga
- Family: Carabidae
- Genus: Amara
- Species: A. alpina

Binomial name
- Amara alpina (Paykull, 1790)

Synonyms
- Amara alaskana Csiki, 1929; Amara angustata J. R. Salberg, 1885; Amara birulai Poppius, 1913; Amara brunnipennis Dejean, 1831; Amara obtusa LeConte, 1855; Amara pullula Poppius, 1906; Amara subsulcata J. R. Salberg, 1880; Carabus alpinus Paykull, 1790; Curtonotus argutus Casey, 1918; Curtonotus caligatus Putzeys, 1866; Curtonotus cognatus Putzeys, 1866; Curtonotus deficiens Casey, 1918; Curtonotus inanis Casey, 1918; Curtonotus rubripennis Casey, 1918; Curtonotus subtilis Casey, 1924; Leirus boralis Chaudoir, 1843; Leirus brevicornis Ménétriés, 1851

= Amara alpina =

Species of beetle

Amara alpina is a species of beetle of the genus Amara in the family Carabidae. It is native to northern parts of Europe and Asia. It was first described by the Swedish entomologist Gustaf von Paykull in 1790.

== Description ==
The adult length is 7.3 to 11.5 mm (0.29 to 0.45 in). This beetle is mainly black and the elytra are reddish-black and etched with fine longitudinal striations. The legs are often red.

== Distribution ==
Amara alpina is a beetle of cold regions at high altitudes and high latitudes. Its range includes Norway, Sweden, Finland, Great Britain, Siberia and Mongolia. It is also present in Alaska, and it recolonised Canada after the end of the last ice age. It is believed to have survived further south in western Beringia and the northern part of the contiguous United States, and moved northwards when conditions ameliorated and the ice retreated.

== Behaviour ==
In Scandinavia this beetle is often found on dwarf birch (Betula nana), dwarf willow (Salix herbacea), glacier buttercup (Ranunculus glacialis), alpine bearberry (Arctostaphylos alpina), moss bell heather (Harrimanella hypnoides), crowberry (Empetrum) and arctic wood-rush (Luzula nivalis).

Amara alpina was one of three species of beetle that has been observed in Finland eating the dead bodies of other insects on snowfields.
