= Amara ambulans =

Scientific classification
- Kingdom: Animalia
- Phylum: Arthropoda
- Class: Insecta
- Order: Coleoptera
- Suborder: Adephaga
- Family: Carabidae
- Genus: Amara
- Species: A. ambulans

Binomial name
- Amara ambulans (Zimmermann, 1832)

Synonyms
- Celia ambulans Zimmermann, 1832

Species of beetle

Amara ambulans is a species of beetle in the family Carabidae. It is found in Eastern Europe (Ukraine, Russia) and in Asia.
