= Amara avida =

Scientific classification
- Kingdom: Animalia
- Phylum: Arthropoda
- Class: Insecta
- Order: Coleoptera
- Suborder: Adephaga
- Family: Carabidae
- Genus: Amara
- Species: A. avida

Binomial name
- Amara avida (Say, 1823)

Synonyms
- Amara confinis Dejean, 1828; Zabrus avidus Say, 1823

Species of beetle

Amara avida is a species of beetle of the genus Amara in the family Carabidae.
