= Amara californica =

Scientific classification
- Kingdom: Animalia
- Phylum: Arthropoda
- Class: Insecta
- Order: Coleoptera
- Suborder: Adephaga
- Family: Carabidae
- Genus: Amara
- Species: A. californica

Binomial name
- Amara californica Dejean, 1828

Synonyms
- Amara mexicana Dejean, 1831; Amara perspecta Casey, 1918; Amara robustula G.H. Horn, 1892; Celia championi Bates, 1882; Celia consors Casey, 1918; Celia gnara Casey, 1918; Celia pugetana Casey, 1924

Species of beetle

Amara californica is a species of black coloured beetle of the genus Amara in the family Carabidae.

== Subspecies ==
There are two subspecies of A. californica:

- Amara californica californica Dejean, 1828
- Amara californica costaricensis (Bates, 1878)
