= Amara brunnea =

Scientific classification
- Kingdom: Animalia
- Phylum: Arthropoda
- Class: Insecta
- Order: Coleoptera
- Suborder: Adephaga
- Family: Carabidae
- Genus: Amara
- Species: A. brunnea

Binomial name
- Amara brunnea (Gyllenhal, 1810)

Synonyms
- Celia amplicollis Mannerheim, 1853; Harpalus brunneus Gyllenhal, 1810; Harpalus lapponicus C.R. Sahlberg, 1827; Harpalus mongolicus Jedlička, 1966; Harpalus sahlbergi Zetterstedt, 1837

Species of beetle

Amara brunnea is a species of beetle of the genus Amara in the family Carabidae.
