= Amara coelebs =

Scientific classification
- Kingdom: Animalia
- Phylum: Arthropoda
- Class: Insecta
- Order: Coleoptera
- Suborder: Adephaga
- Family: Carabidae
- Genus: Amara
- Species: A. coelebs

Binomial name
- Amara coelebs Hayward, 1908

Synonyms
- Amara leviceps Casey, 1924; Amara nebraskana Casey, 1918; Amara oblongula Casey, 1918; Amara rustica Casey, 1918

Species of beetle

Amara coelebs is a species of beetle of the genus Amara in the family Carabidae.
