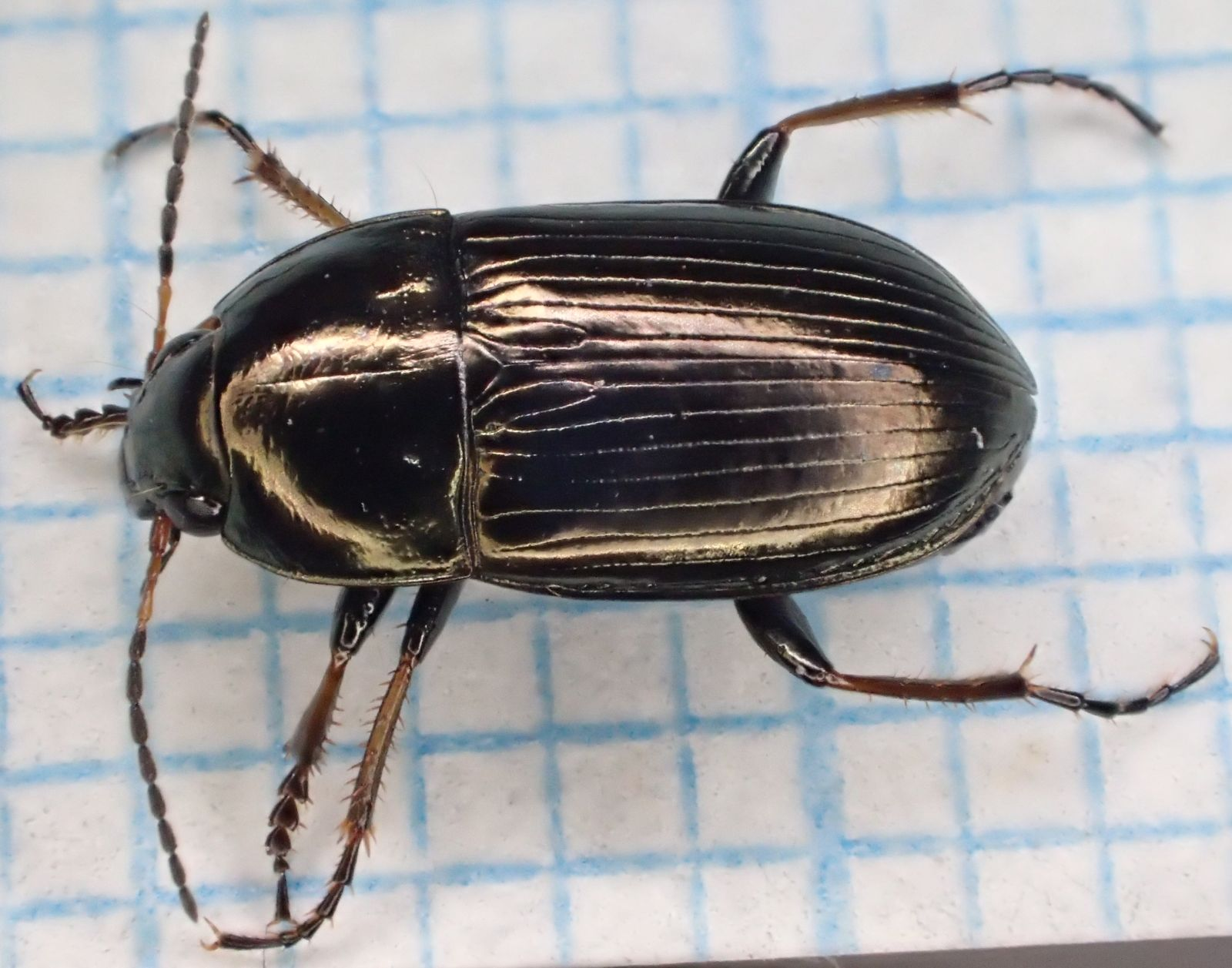

Scientific classification
- Kingdom: Animalia
- Phylum: Arthropoda
- Clade: Pancrustacea
- Class: Insecta
- Order: Coleoptera
- Suborder: Adephaga
- Family: Carabidae
- Genus: Amara
- Species: A. plebeja

Binomial name
- Amara plebeja (Gyllenhal, 1810)

Synonyms
- Amara anthobia var. barnevillei Croissandeau, 1893; Amara anthobia var. brisouti Csiki, 1929; Amara atra Stephens, 1828; Amara cylindrella Schiødte, 1837; Amara lapidicola Heer, 1837; Amara lenticularis Schiødte, 1837; Amara noctivaga Hochhuth, 1871; Amara septentrionalis Curtis, 1840; Amara varicolor Heer, 1838; Amara (Amara) punctibasis Jedlička, 1957; Amara (Triaena) tridens A. Morawitz, 1862; Harpalus plebejus Gyllenhal, 1810

= Amara plebeja =

Species of beetle

Amara plebeja is a species of ground beetle native to Europe.

== Behavior and ecology ==
The habitat of A. plebeja has been observed to change during the species' life cycle: it reproduces in grass vegetation, and hibernates in deciduous trees. They fly between these habitats in spring and autumn. After moving between habitats, A. plebeja autolyse their flight muscles, which are subsequently regrown before traveling to the next habitat.

A. plebeja is typically phytophagous, with seeds being its primary food source, however it has been observed to be occasionally carnivorous, especially in its larval form.

== Gallery ==
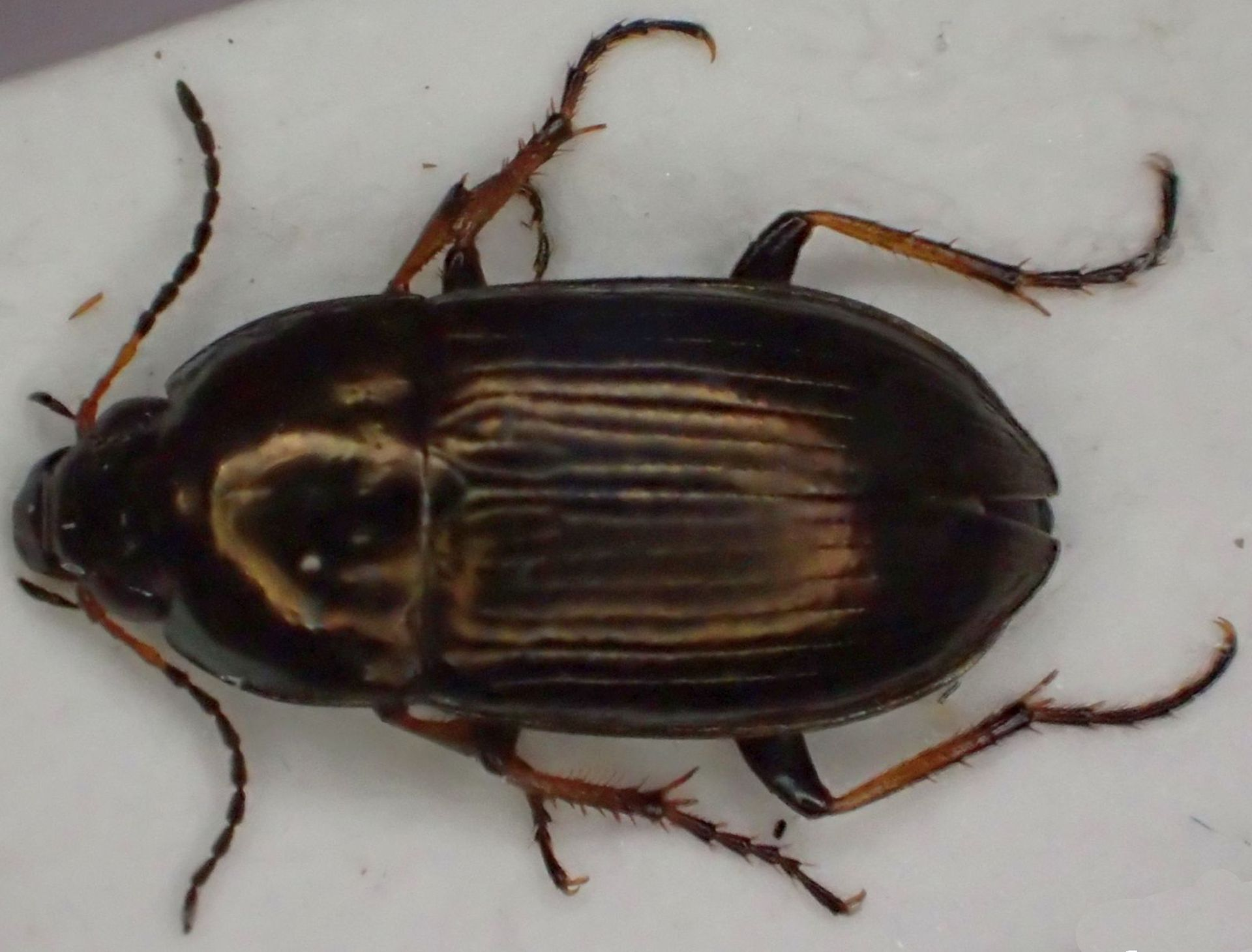
Female

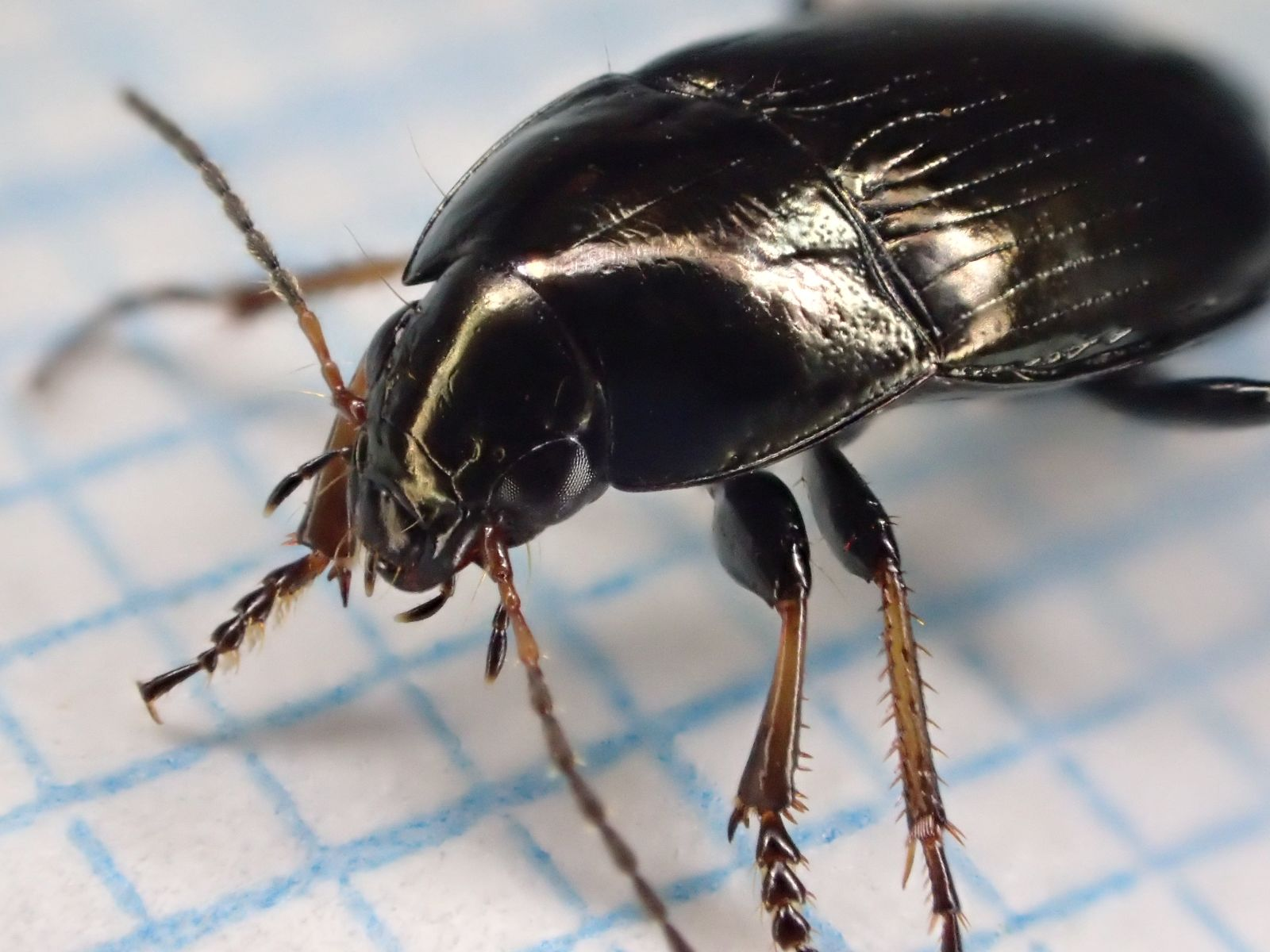
Male

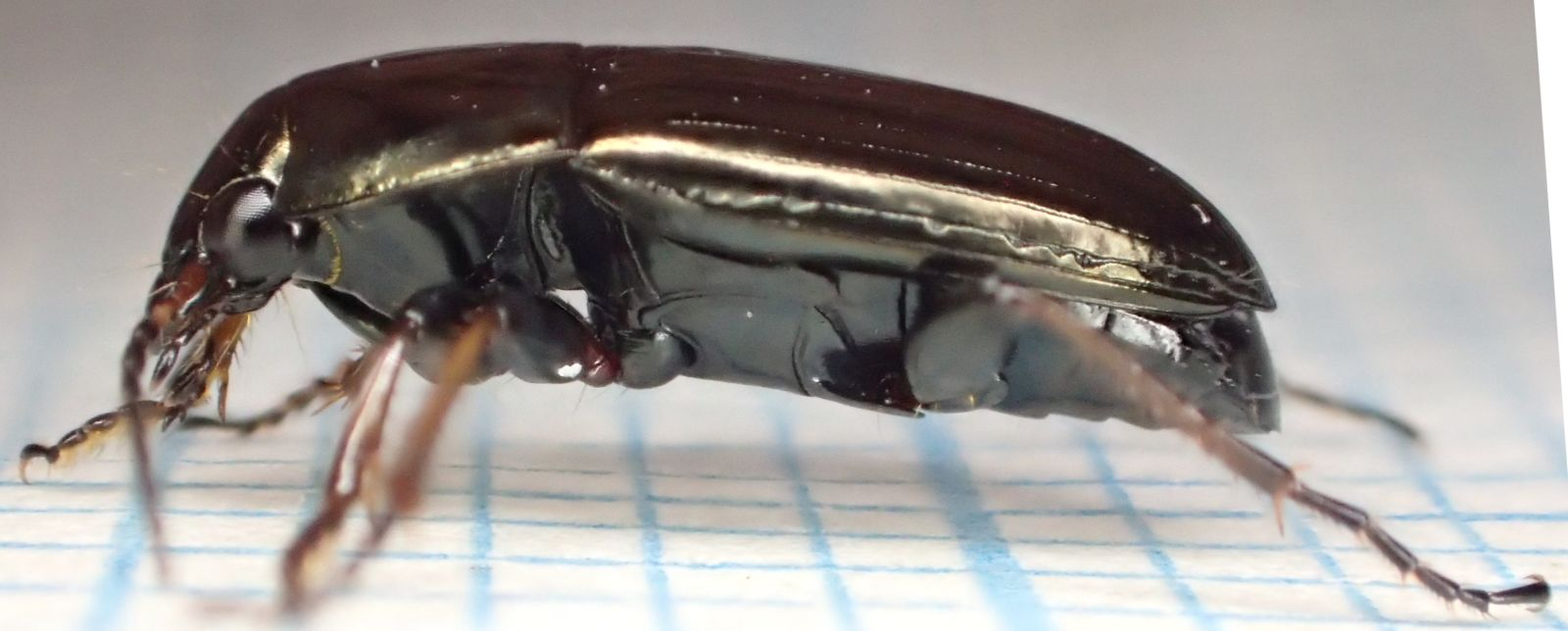
Male

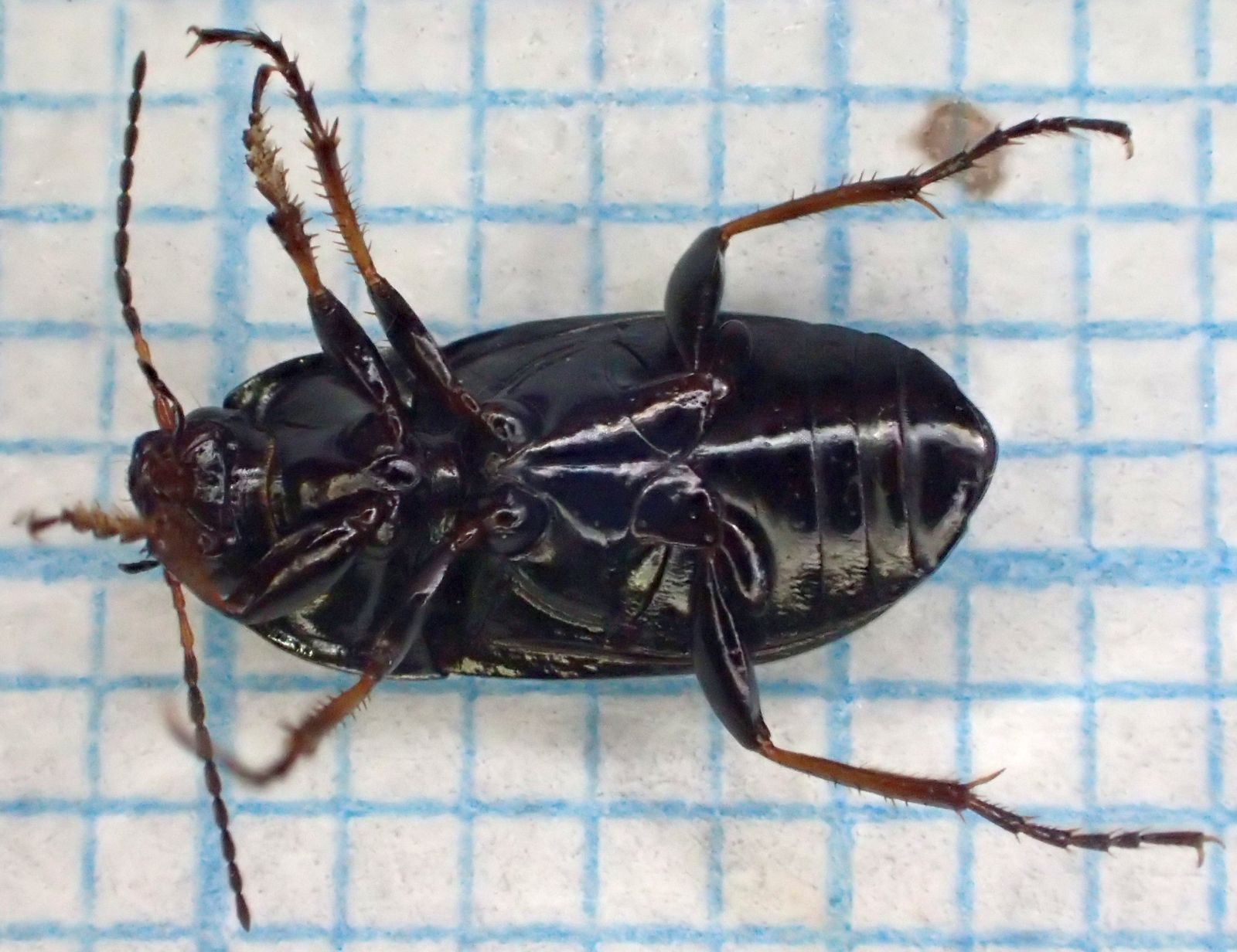
Male

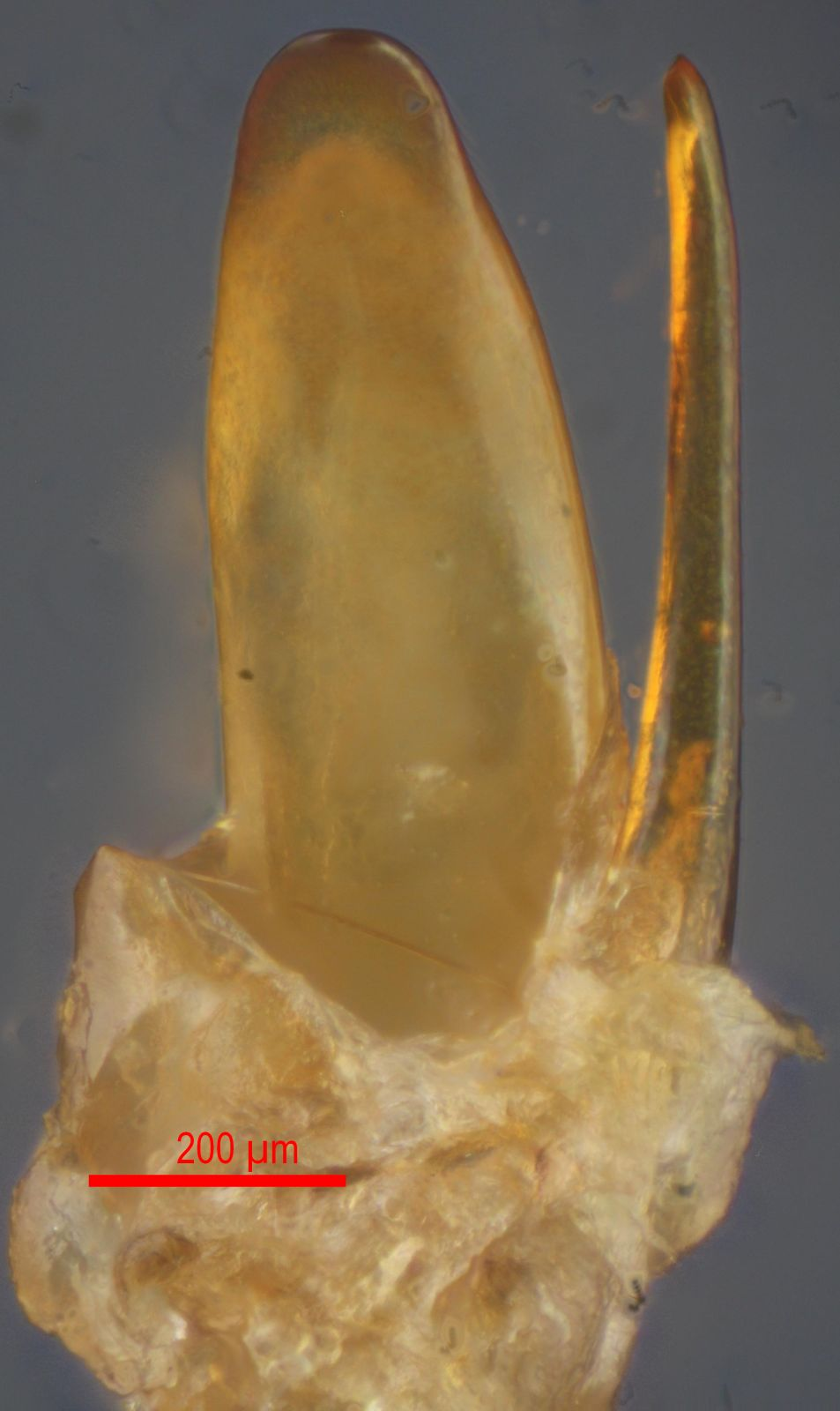
Penis

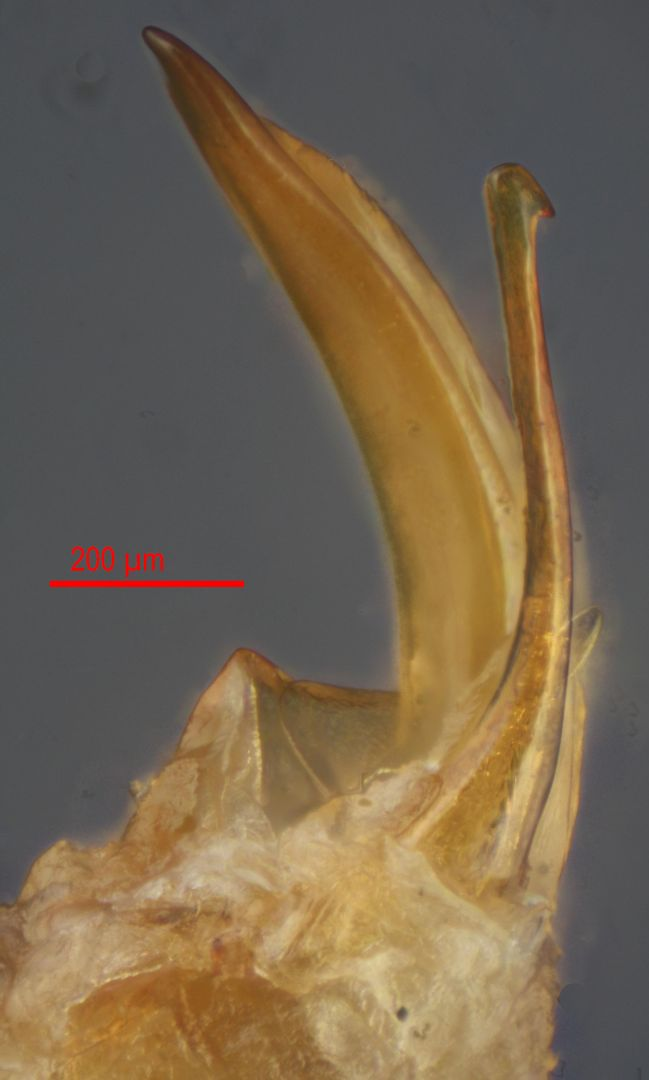
Penis side view

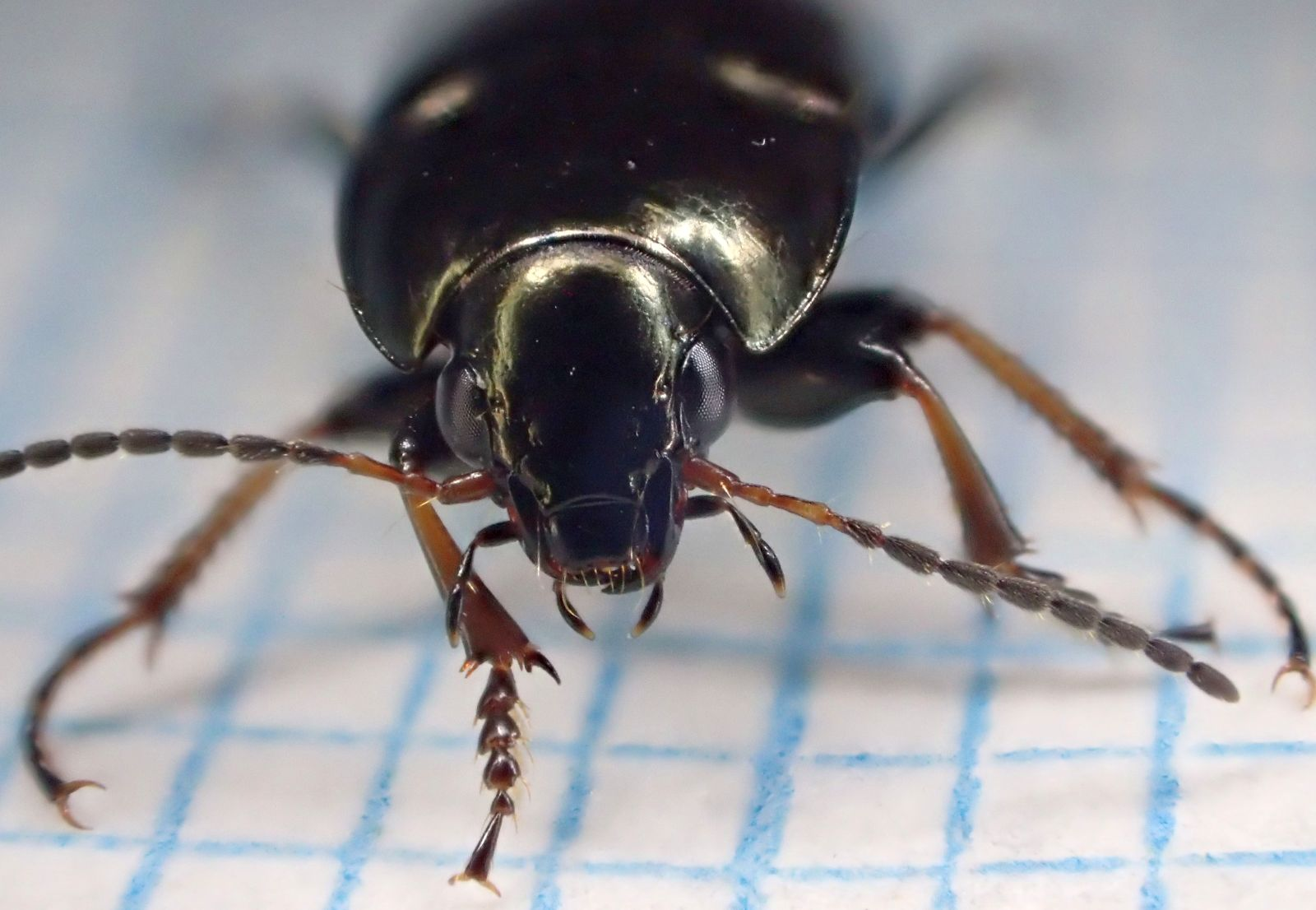
Male

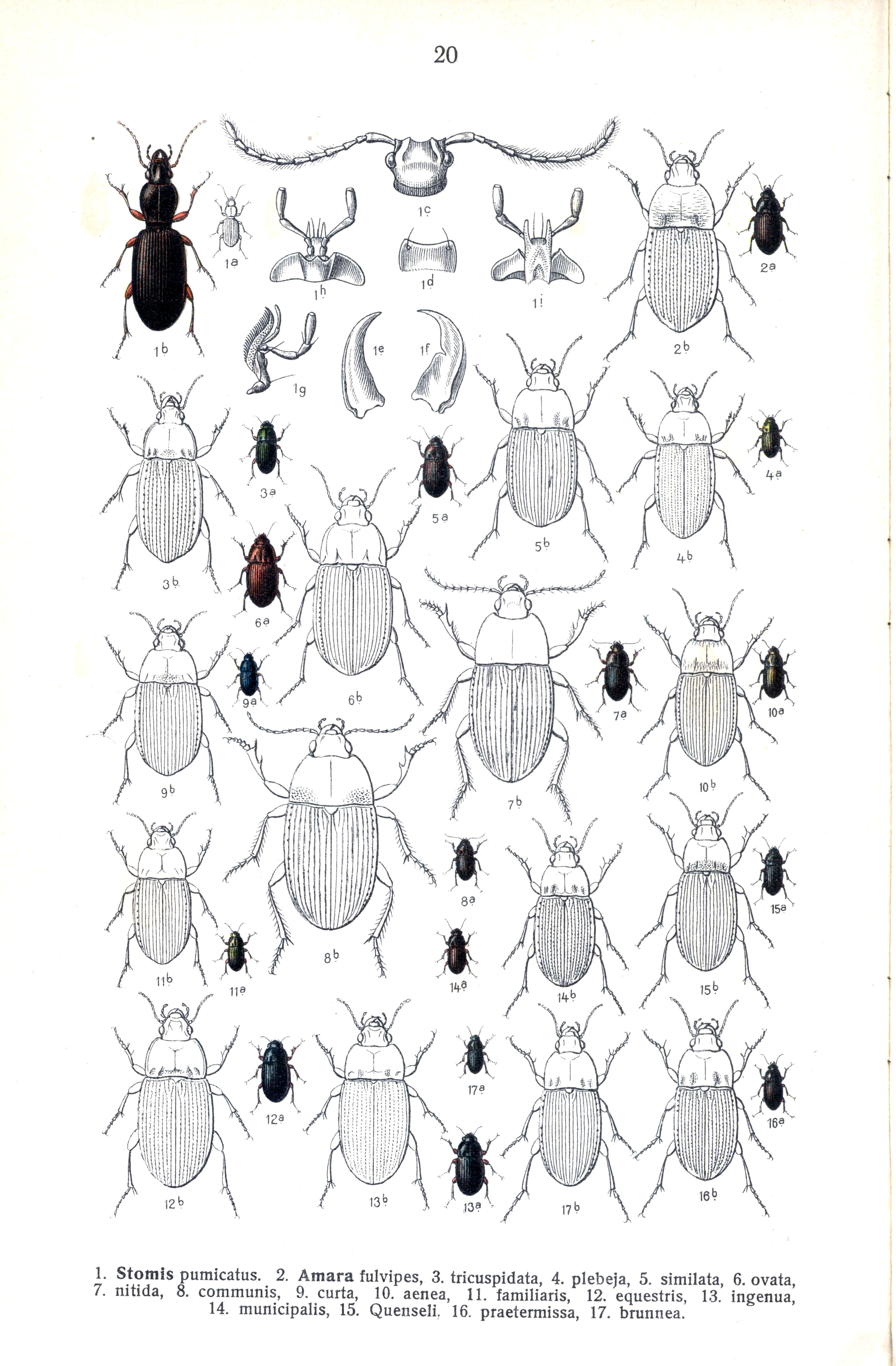
