= Oleg Kryzhanovsky =

Russian entomologist

Oleg Leonidovich Kryzhanovsky (Russian: Крыжановский, Олег Леонидович); 28 May 1918, Ekaterinburg – 15 June 1997) was a Soviet entomologist who specialised in Coleoptera especially Carabidae and Histeridae. Kryzhanovsky published more than 250 scientific works including 6 monographs (for list see External Link). He described 135 new species of beetles.

Kryzhanovskiana olegi (Kataev et al., 2019), an extinct species of ground beetle from the Cretaceous Burmese amber, is named after Kryzhanovsky.
