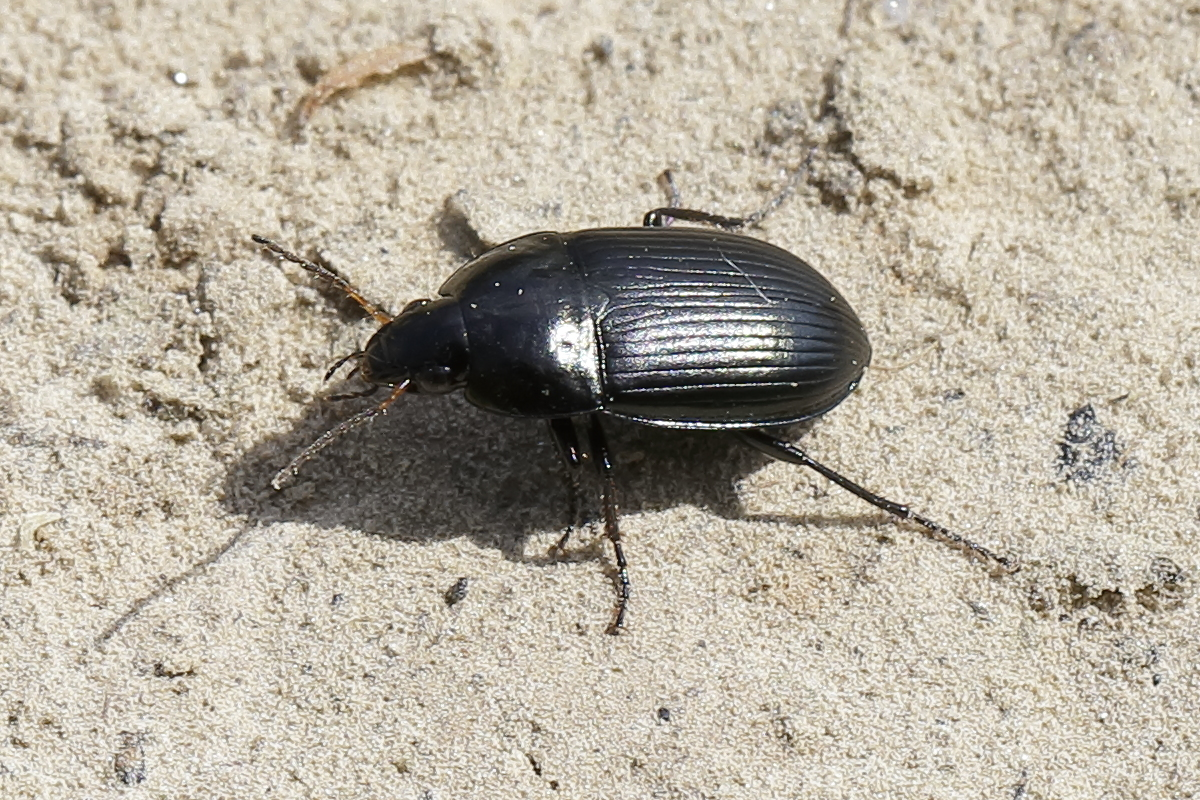
- Amara ovata, Germany

Scientific classification
- Domain: Eukaryota
- Kingdom: Animalia
- Phylum: Arthropoda
- Class: Insecta
- Order: Coleoptera
- Suborder: Adephaga
- Family: Carabidae
- Subfamily: Pterostichinae
- Tribe: Zabrini; Bonelli, 1810

= Zabrini =

Tribe of beetles

Zabrini is a tribe of ground beetles in the subfamily Pterostichinae of beetle family Carabidae, found mainly in North America and Europe. There are more than 750 described species in three genera of Zabrini, more than 600 of which are in the genus Amara.

== Genera ==
There are three genera in the tribe Zabrini, within two subtribes:

- Subtribe Amarina Zimmermann, 1832
  - Amara Bonelli, 1810 – Sun beetles
  - Pseudamara Lindroth, 1968
- Subtribe Zabrina Bonelli, 1810
  - Zabrus Clairville, 1806
