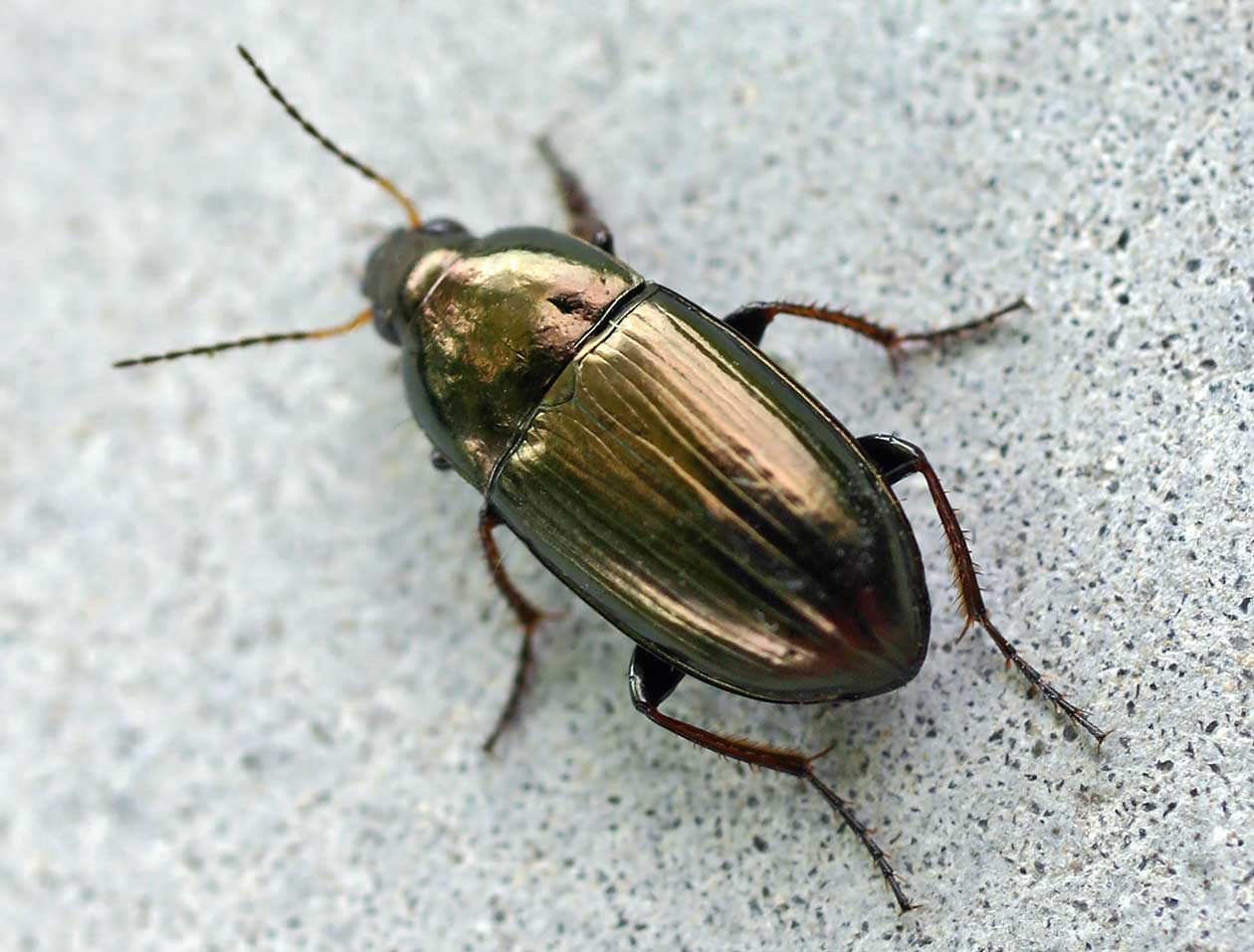
- Amara aenea

Scientific classification
- Kingdom: Animalia
- Phylum: Arthropoda
- Class: Insecta
- Order: Coleoptera
- Suborder: Adephaga
- Family: Carabidae
- Subfamily: Pterostichinae
- Tribe: Zabrini
- Subtribe: Amarina; Zimmermann, 1832
- Genus: Amara; Bonelli, 1810

Type species
- Carabus vulgaris (= Amara lunicollis Schiødte, 1837) Linnaeus sensu Panzer, 1797

Subgenera
- See text

Synonyms
- Subtribe: Amaroiden Zimmermann, 1832; Isopleuridae Kirby, 1837; Agronomaeidae Gistel, 1848; Pangeteidae Gistel, 1856; Genus: Agronoma Gistel, 1848; Linomus Fischer von Waldheim, 1829; Pangetes Gistel, 1856

= Amara (beetle) =

Sun beetles

Genus of beetles

Amara is a large genus of carabid beetles, commonly called the sun beetles. Many are holarctic, but a few species are neotropical or occur in eastern Asia.

These ground beetles are mostly black or bronze-colored, and many species have a characteristic "bullet-shaped" habitus, as shown in the photos, making them taxonomically difficult for a beginner. They are predominantly herbivorous, with some species known to climb ripening grasses to feed on the seeds. Other species are used as weed control agents. Numerous species are adventive in non-native habitats, particularly species that thrive in synanthropic settings.

== Gallery ==
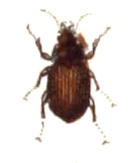
A. communis

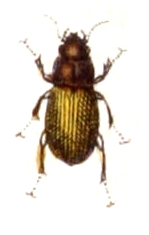
A. fulva

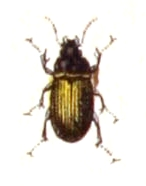
A. lunicollis

A. ovata

== Subgenera ==
The following are subgenera of Amara:

- Acorius Zimmermann, 1831
- Allobradytus Iablokoff-Khnzorian, 1975
- Amara Bonelli, 1810
- Amarocelia Motschulsky, 1862
- Amathitis Zimmermann, 1831
- Ammoleirus Tschitscherine, 1899
- Ammoxena Tschitscherine, 1894
- Armatoleirides Tanaka, 1957
- Atlantocnemis Antoine, 1953
- Bradytodema Hieke, 1983
- Bradytulus Tschitscherine, 1894
- Bradytus Stephens, 1827
- Camptocelia Jeannel, 1942
- Celia Zimmermann, 1832
- Cribramara Kryzhanovskij, 1964
- Cumeres Andrewes, 1924
- Curtonotus Stephens, 1827
- Eoleirides Tschitscherine, 1898
- Harpaloamara Baliani, 1934
- Harpalodema Reitter, 1888
- Heterodema Tschitscherine, 1894
- Hyalamara Tschitscherine, 1903
- Leiocnemis Zimmermann, 1831
- Leiramara Hieke, 1988
- Leirides Putzeys, 1866
- Leiromorpha Ganglbauer, 1891
- Leironotus Ganglbauer, 1892
- Leuris Lutshnik, 1927
- Microleirus Kryzhanovskij, 1974
- Neopercosia Hieke, 1978
- Paracelia Bedel, 1899
- Paraleirides Sainte-Claire Deville, 1906
- Parapercosia Tschitscherine, 1899
- Percosia Zimmermann, 1832
- Phaenotrichus Tschitscherine, 1898
- Phanerodonta Tschitscherine, 1894
- Polysitamara Kryzhanovskij, 1968
- Pseudoamara Baliani, 1934
- Pseudocelia Lutshnik, 1935
- Pseudoleirides Kryzhanovskij, 1968
- Pseudoleiromorpha Hieke, 1981
- Reductocelia Lafer, 1989
- Shunichius Habu, 1972
- Xanthamara Bedel, 1899
- Xenocelia Hieke, 2001
- Zabrocelis Putzeys, 1866
- Zezea Csiki, 1929

== See also ==
- List of Amara species
