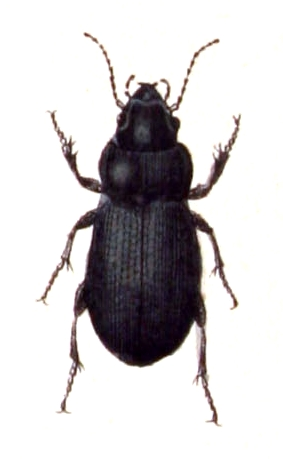
- Zabrus spinipes

Scientific classification
- Domain: Eukaryota
- Kingdom: Animalia
- Phylum: Arthropoda
- Class: Insecta
- Order: Coleoptera
- Suborder: Adephaga
- Family: Carabidae
- Subfamily: Pterostichinae
- Tribe: Zabrini
- Subtribe: Zabrina; Bonelli, 1810
- Genus: Zabrus; Clairville, 1806

Type species
- Carabus gibbus (= Carabus tenebrioides Goeze, 1777) Fabricius, 1794

= Zabrus =

Genus of beetles

Zabrus is a genus of ground beetles. They are, unusually for ground beetles, omnivores or even herbivores, and Zabrus tenebrioides can become a pest in cereal fields.

== Subgenera ==
The following are subgenera of Zabrus:

- Aulacozabrus Ganglbauer
- Cantabrozabrus Anichtchenko & Ruiz-Tapiador, 2008
- Craspedozabrus Ganglbauer, 1915
- Epomidozabrus Ganglbauer, 1915
- Euryzabrus Ganglbauer, 1915
- Eutroctes Zimmermann, 1831
- Himalayozabrus Andújar & Serrano, 2000
- Iberozabrus Ganglbauer, 1915
- Italozabrus Andújar & Serrano, 2000
- Lobozabrus Ganglbauer, 1915
- Macarozabrus Ganglbauer, 1915
- Pelor Bonelli, 1810
- Platyzabrus Jeanne, 1968
- Polysitus Zimmermann, 1831
- Zabrus Clairville, 1806

== Species ==
Zabrus contains the following species:

- Zabrus aciculatus Schaum, 1864
- Zabrus aegaeus Apfelbeck, 1904
- Zabrus aetolus Schaum, 1864
- Zabrus albanicus Apfelbeck, 1904
- Zabrus ambiguus Rambur, 1838
- Zabrus anatolicus Ganglbauer, 1915
- Zabrus angustatus Rambur, 1838
- Zabrus angusticollis Ganglbauer, 1915
- Zabrus apfelbecki Ganglbauer, 1915
- Zabrus arragonensis Heyden, 1883
- Zabrus asiaticus Laporte, 1834
- Zabrus aurichalceus M. F. Adams, 1817
- Zabrus balcanicus Heyden, 1883
- Zabrus bischoffi J. Müller, 1936
- Zabrus bodemeyeri Ganglbauer, 1915
- Zabrus boldorii Schatzmayr, 1943
- Zabrus brevicollis Schaum, 1857
- Zabrus brondelii Reiche, 1872
- Zabrus cameranus Arribas, 1994
- Zabrus canaricus Machado, 1992
- Zabrus castroi Martinez y Saez, 1873
- Zabrus chalceus Faldermann, 1836
- Zabrus chiosanus Reitter, 1889
- Zabrus coiffaiti Jeanne, 1970
- Zabrus consanguineus Chevrolat, 1865
- Zabrus constrictus Graells, 1858
- Zabrus corpulentus Schaum, 1864
- Zabrus costae Heyden, 1891
- Zabrus crassus Dejean, 1828
- Zabrus curtus (Audinet-Serville, 1821)
- Zabrus damascenus Reiche & Saulcy, 1855
- Zabrus deflexicollis Fairmaire, 1880
- Zabrus distinctus H. Lucas, 1842
- Zabrus estrellanus Heyden, 1880
- Zabrus farctus C. Zimmermann, 1831
- Zabrus femoratus Dejean, 1828
- Zabrus flavangulus Chevrolat, 1840
- Zabrus foveipennis Heyden, 1883
- Zabrus foveolatus Schaum, 1864
- Zabrus fuentei Anichtchenko & Ruiz-Tapiador, 2008
- Zabrus galicianus Jeanne, 1970
- Zabrus ganglbaueri Apfelbeck, 1906
- Zabrus gibbulus Jeanne, 1985
- Zabrus graecus Dejean, 1828
- Zabrus gravis Dejean, 1828
- Zabrus guildensis Alluaud, 1932
- Zabrus hellenicus Heyden, 1883
- Zabrus helopioides Reiche & Saulcy, 1855
- Zabrus heydeni Ganglbauer, 1915
- Zabrus hiekei Anichtchenko & Gueorguiev, 2009
- Zabrus humeralis Uhagon, 1904
- Zabrus iconiensis Ganglbauer, 1905
- Zabrus idaeus Schweiger, 1968
- Zabrus ignavus Csiki, 1907
- Zabrus incrassatus (Ahrens, 1814)
- Zabrus inflatus Dejean, 1828
- Zabrus jurjurae Peyerimhoff, 1908
- Zabrus kurdistanicus Freude, 1989
- Zabrus laevicollis Schaum, 1864
- Zabrus laevigatus C. Zimmermann, 1831
- Zabrus laticollis Apfelbeck, 1904
- Zabrus laurae Toribio, 1989
- Zabrus lycius Ganglbauer, 1915
- Zabrus malloryi Andrewes, 1930
- Zabrus marginicollis Dejean, 1828
- Zabrus maroccanus Reiche, 1864
- Zabrus martensi Freude, 1986
- Zabrus mateui Novoa, 1980
- Zabrus melancholicus Schaum, 1864
- Zabrus morio Mandrias, 1832
- Zabrus notabilis Martinez y Saez, 1873
- Zabrus obesus (Audinet-Serville, 1821)
- Zabrus oertzeni Reitter, 1885
- Zabrus orsinii Dejean, 1831
- Zabrus ovalis Fairmaire, 1859
- Zabrus ovipennis Chaudoir, 1844
- Zabrus pecoudi Colas, 1942
- Zabrus pentheri Ganglbauer, 1905
- Zabrus peristericus Apfelbeck, 1904
- Zabrus pinguis Dejean, 1831
- Zabrus poggii Freude, 2002
- Zabrus politus Gautier des Cottes, 1869
- Zabrus potanini Semenov, 1889
- Zabrus prietoi Ruiz-Tapiador & Anichtchenko, 2008
- Zabrus przewalskii Semenov, 1889
- Zabrus puncticeps Schaum, 1864
- Zabrus punctifrons Fairmaire, 1866
- Zabrus punctiventris Schaum, 1864
- Zabrus reflexus Schaum, 1862
- Zabrus rhodopensis Apfelbeck, 1904
- Zabrus robustus C.Zimmermann, 1831
- Zabrus rotundatus Rambur, 1838
- Zabrus rotundicollis Ménétries, 1836
- Zabrus rugulosus Kraatz, 1884
- Zabrus segnis Schaum, 1864
- Zabrus seidlitzi Schaum, 1864
- Zabrus semipunctatus Fairmaire, 1859
- Zabrus seriatus Ganglbauer, 1915
- Zabrus silphoides Dejean, 1828
- Zabrus skoupyi Hejkal, 2011
- Zabrus socialis Schaum, 1864
- Zabrus socialis Schaum, 1864
- Zabrus spectabilis Hampe, 1852
- Zabrus spinipes (Fabricius, 1798)
- Zabrus sublaevis Ménétries, 1836
- Zabrus tenebrioides (Goeze, 1777)
- Zabrus tenuestriatus Fairmaire, 1884
- Zabrus theveneti Chevrolat, 1874
- Zabrus toelgi Breit, 1926
- Zabrus trinii (Fischer von Waldheim, 1817)
- Zabrus tumidus Reiche & Saulcy, 1855
- Zabrus uhagoni Ruiz-Tapiador & Anichtchenko, 2008
- Zabrus urbionensis Jeanne, 1970
- Zabrus validus Schaum, 1862
- Zabrus vasconicus Uhagon, 1904
- Zabrus vaulogeri Ganglbauer, 1915
- Zabrus ventricosus (C.Zimmermann, 1831)
- Zabrus vignai Freude, 1990
