= Zabrus aetolus =

Scientific classification
- Domain: Eukaryota
- Kingdom: Animalia
- Phylum: Arthropoda
- Class: Insecta
- Order: Coleoptera
- Suborder: Adephaga
- Family: Carabidae
- Genus: Zabrus
- Subgenus: Zabrus (Pelor)
- Species: Z. aetolus

Binomial name
- Zabrus aetolus Schaum, 1864

Species of beetle

Zabrus aetolus is a species of ground beetle in the Pterostichinae subfamily that is endemic to Greece.

== Subspecies ==
There are eight subspecies of Z. aetolus:

- Z. aetolus aetolus Schaum, 1864
- Z. aetolus borisi Breit, 1936
- Z. aetolus erymanthius Ganglbauer, 1915
- Z. aetolus kodymi Maran, 1940
- Z. aetolus matejkai Maran, 1940
- Z. aetolus ossensis Maran, 1940
- Z. aetolus purkeynei Maran, 1940
- Z. aetolus winkleri J. Müller, 1946
