= Zabrus socialis =

Scientific classification
- Domain: Eukaryota
- Kingdom: Animalia
- Phylum: Arthropoda
- Class: Insecta
- Order: Coleoptera
- Suborder: Adephaga
- Family: Carabidae
- Genus: Zabrus
- Subgenus: Zabrus (Pelor)
- Species: Z. socialis

Binomial name
- Zabrus socialis Schaum, 1864

Synonyms
- Zabrus angusticollis Ganglbauer, 1915

Species of beetle

Zabrus socialis is a species of ground beetle in the Pelor subgenus that can be found in Near East, former Yugoslavia and Turkey (Bursa).

== Subspecies ==
There are two subspecies of Z. socialis:

- Z. socialis socialis Schaum, 1864
- Z. socialis werneri Ganglbauer, 1915
