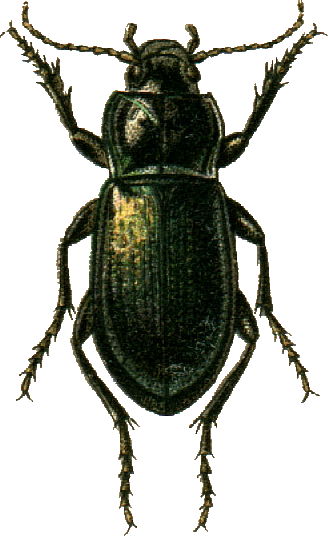
- Zabrus chalceus

Scientific classification
- Domain: Eukaryota
- Kingdom: Animalia
- Phylum: Arthropoda
- Class: Insecta
- Order: Coleoptera
- Suborder: Adephaga
- Family: Carabidae
- Genus: Zabrus
- Subgenus: Zabrus (Eutroctes)
- Species: Z. chalceus

Binomial name
- Zabrus chalceus Faldermann, 1836

Synonyms
- Zabrus aureolus Faldermann, 1836; Zabrus costipennis Faldermann, 1836; Zabrus lugubris Faldermann, 1836; Zabrus oxygonus Chaudoir, 1846

= Zabrus chalceus =

Species of beetle

Zabrus chalceus is a species of ground beetle in the Eutroctes subgenus that can be found in Armenia and Turkey.
