= Zabrus corpulentus =

Scientific classification
- Domain: Eukaryota
- Kingdom: Animalia
- Phylum: Arthropoda
- Class: Insecta
- Order: Coleoptera
- Suborder: Adephaga
- Family: Carabidae
- Genus: Zabrus
- Subgenus: Zabrus (Pelor)
- Species: Z. corpulentus

Binomial name
- Zabrus corpulentus Schaum, 1864

Synonyms
- Zabrus reitteri Apfelbeck, 1904

Species of beetle

Zabrus corpulentus is a species of ground beetle in the Pelor subgenus that can be found in Bulgaria and Near East.

== Subspecies ==
There are three subspecies of Z. corpulentus:

- Z. corpulentus armeniacus Ganglbauer, 1915
- Z. corpulentus corpulentus Schaum, 1864
- Z. corpulentus ponticus Ganglbauer, 1915
