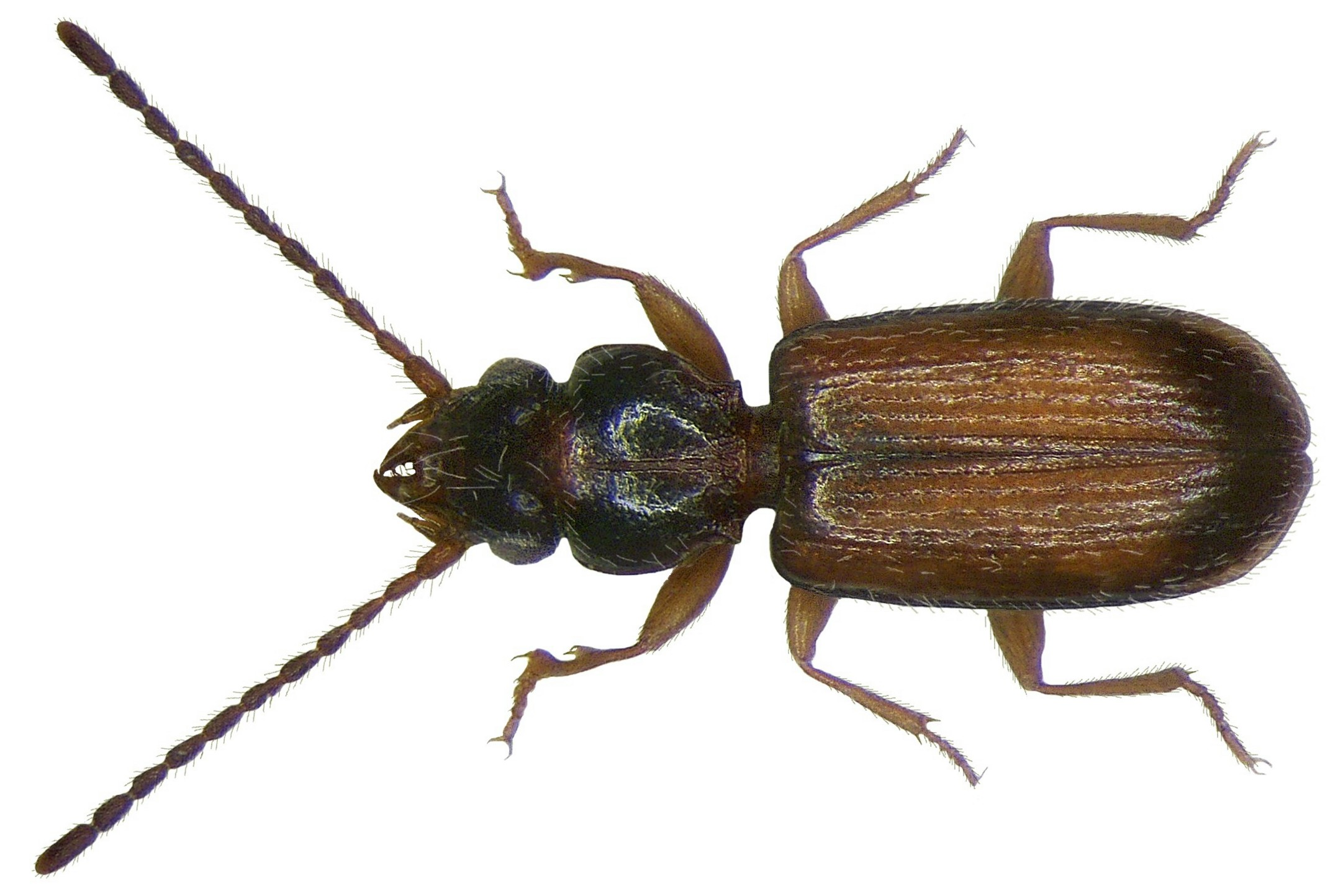
- Perileptus areolatus

Scientific classification
- Kingdom: Animalia
- Phylum: Arthropoda
- Clade: Pancrustacea
- Class: Insecta
- Order: Coleoptera
- Suborder: Adephaga
- Family: Carabidae
- Subfamily: Trechinae
- Tribe: Trechini
- Subtribe: Perileptina
- Genus: Perileptus; Schaum, 1860

Subgenera
- Parablemus G.Müller, 1939; Perileptodes Jeannel, 1926; Perileptus Schaum, 1860; Pyrrotachys Sloane, 1896

= Perileptus =

Genus of beetles

Perileptus is a genus in the beetle family Carabidae. There are more than 50 described species in Perileptus.

== Species ==
These 53 species belong to the genus Perileptus:

- Perileptus africanus Jeannel, 1926 (Africa)
- Perileptus areolatus (Creutzer, 1799) (Palearctic)
- Perileptus asahinai Ueno, 1974 (Japan)
- Perileptus barberae Ortuño, 1991 (Spain)
- Perileptus birmanicus Jeannel, 1930 (Myanmar)
- Perileptus boettcheri (Jedlicka, 1935) (Philippines)
- Perileptus cameroni Jeannel, 1923 (India)
- Perileptus ceylanicus (Nietner, 1857) (Sri Lanka and India)
- Perileptus columbus Darlington, 1934 (Cuba)
- Perileptus constrictipes (Sloane, 1896) (Australia)
- Perileptus convexicollis Mateu, 1983 (Chad)
- Perileptus cylindricollis Baehr, 1997 (Australia)
- Perileptus cylindriformis Ueno, 1977 (Bhutan)
- Perileptus darlingtoni Casale & Laneyrie, 1989 [nomen novum for jeanneli Darlington, 1962] (Indonesia and New Guinea)
- Perileptus davidsoni Deuve, 1989 (Nepal)
- Perileptus dentifer Darlington, 1936 (the Lesser Antilles and Hispaniola)
- Perileptus grandicollis Ueno & Yin, 1993 (China)
- Perileptus hesperidum Jeannel, 1925 (Cape Verde)
- Perileptus humidus Coquerel, 1866 (Reunion)
- Perileptus imaicus Jeannel, 1923 (China and India)
- Perileptus indicus Jeannel, 1923 (Sri Lanka, India, and Myanmar)
- Perileptus japonicus Bates, 1873 (China, South Korea, Japan, Taiwan, Indonesia, New Guinea, Russia)
- Perileptus jeanneli Darlington, 1934 (the Lesser Antilles)
- Perileptus jedlickai Ueno, 1976 (Iraq and Iran)
- Perileptus jelineki Muilwijk & Felix, 2008 (Iran)
- Perileptus larueei Jeannel, 1938 (Vanuatu)
- Perileptus laticeps Ueno, 1955 (Japan)
- Perileptus latimargo G.Müller, 1939 (Ethiopia)
- Perileptus ledouxi Deuve, 2004 (Ethiopia)
- Perileptus leleupi Basilewsky, 1951 (Democratic Republic of the Congo and Burundi)
- Perileptus madecassus Fairmaire, 1898 (Madagascar)
- Perileptus mameti Jeannel, 1946 (Reunion and Mauritius)
- Perileptus melas Jeannel, 1926 (Philippines)
- Perileptus mesasiaticus Ueno, 1976 (Saudi Arabia, Southwest Asia)
- Perileptus microps Andrewes, 1935 (India)
- Perileptus minimus Baehr, 1987 (Australia)
- Perileptus minutus Darlington, 1936 (the Lesser Antilles and Hispaniola)
- Perileptus morimotoi Ueno, 1955 (Japan)
- Perileptus naraensis Ueno, 1955 (Japan)
- Perileptus pilifer (Jeannel, 1926) (Indonesia and New Guinea)
- Perileptus platypterus Jeannel, 1923 (Indonesia)
- Perileptus promontorii Péringuey, 1896 (Namibia and South Africa)
- Perileptus pusilloides Deuve & Liang, 2016 (China)
- Perileptus pusillus Jeannel, 1923 (China, Taiwan, and Vietnam)
- Perileptus robustus Jeannel, 1923 (Iran and India)
- Perileptus rutilus Schaum, 1860 (Egypt, Yemen, Chad, and Sudan)
- Perileptus shakletoni Jeannel, 1935 (Mauretania, Niger, and Kenya)
- Perileptus sloanei B.Moore, 1966 (Australia)
- Perileptus stierlini Putzeys, 1870 (Algeria, Egypt, Israel, Syria, Niger, and Chad)
- Perileptus subopacus Baehr, 1987 (Australia)
- Perileptus testaceus Putzeys, 1870 (Arab Emirates, Oman, Yemen, and Somalia)
- Perileptus westralis B.Moore, 1972 (Australia)
- Perileptus wollastoni Jeannel, 1925 (Cape Verde)
