= Zabrus aciculatus =

Scientific classification
- Domain: Eukaryota
- Kingdom: Animalia
- Phylum: Arthropoda
- Class: Insecta
- Order: Coleoptera
- Suborder: Adephaga
- Family: Carabidae
- Genus: Zabrus
- Subgenus: Zabrus (Eutroctes)
- Species: Z. aciculatus

Binomial name
- Zabrus aciculatus Schaum, 1864

Synonyms
- Zabrus laevigatus Chaudoir, 1846

Species of beetle

Zabrus aciculatus is a species of ground beetle in the Eutroctes subgenus that can be found in Armenia and Turkey.
