= Zabrus ovipennis =

Scientific classification
- Domain: Eukaryota
- Kingdom: Animalia
- Phylum: Arthropoda
- Class: Insecta
- Order: Coleoptera
- Suborder: Adephaga
- Family: Carabidae
- Genus: Zabrus
- Subgenus: Zabrus (Pelor)
- Species: Z. ovipennis

Binomial name
- Zabrus ovipennis Chaudoir, 1844

Species of beetle

Zabrus ovipennis is a species of ground beetle in the Pelor subgenus. It was described by Maximilien Chaudoir in 1844 and is endemic to Iran.
