= Zabrus seriatus =

Scientific classification
- Domain: Eukaryota
- Kingdom: Animalia
- Phylum: Arthropoda
- Class: Insecta
- Order: Coleoptera
- Suborder: Adephaga
- Family: Carabidae
- Genus: Zabrus
- Subgenus: Zabrus (Pelor)
- Species: Z. seriatus

Binomial name
- Zabrus seriatus Ganglbauer, 1915

Synonyms
- Zabrus seriatus splendens Ganglbauer, 1915

Species of beetle

Zabrus seriatus is a species of ground beetle in the Pelor subgenus that can be found in Turkey and Erzerum, Armenia.
