= Nebria speiseri =

Scientific classification
- Domain: Eukaryota
- Kingdom: Animalia
- Phylum: Arthropoda
- Class: Insecta
- Order: Coleoptera
- Suborder: Adephaga
- Family: Carabidae
- Subfamily: Nebriinae
- Tribe: Nebriini
- Genus: Nebria
- Species: N. speiseri

Binomial name
- Nebria speiseri Ganglbauer, 1891

Synonyms
- Nebria jahorina Horvatovich, 1973; Nebria komensis Horvatovich, 1973; Nebria mediana Horvatovich, 1973; Nebria telekiana Csiki, 1940

Species of beetle

Nebria speiseri is a species in the beetle family Carabidae. It is found in Bosnia-Herzegovina, former Yugoslavia, Montenegro, and Kosovo.

== Subspecies ==
These two subspecies belong to the species Nebria speiseri:

- Nebria speiseri speiseri Ganglbauer, 1891 (Bosnia-Herzegovina)
- Nebria speiseri telekiana Csiki, 1940 (former Yugoslavia, Montenegro, and Kosovo)
