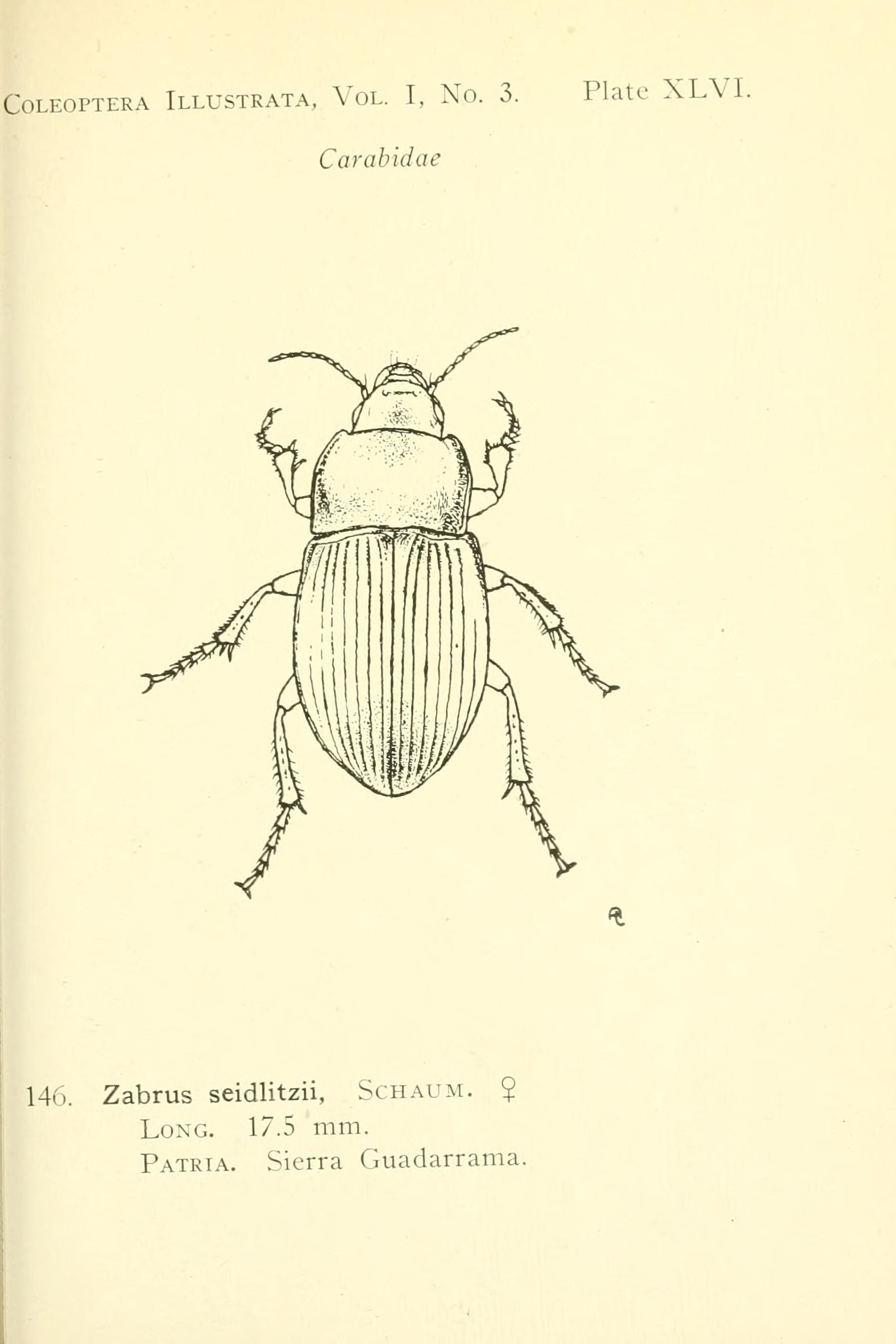

Scientific classification
- Kingdom: Animalia
- Phylum: Arthropoda
- Class: Insecta
- Order: Coleoptera
- Suborder: Adephaga
- Family: Carabidae
- Genus: Zabrus
- Subgenus: Zabrus (Pelor)
- Species: Z. seidlitzi

Binomial name
- Zabrus seidlitzi Schaum, 1864

Synonyms
- Zabrus seidlitzi gredosanus Jeanne, 1970

= Zabrus seidlitzi =

Species of beetle

Zabrus seidlitzi is a species of ground beetle in the Pelor subgenus that is endemic to Spain.
