= Zabrus brevicollis =

Scientific classification
- Domain: Eukaryota
- Kingdom: Animalia
- Phylum: Arthropoda
- Class: Insecta
- Order: Coleoptera
- Suborder: Adephaga
- Family: Carabidae
- Genus: Zabrus
- Subgenus: Zabrus (Pelor)
- Species: Z. brevicollis

Binomial name
- Zabrus brevicollis Schaum, 1857

Synonyms
- Zabrus rufipalpis Schaum, 1864; Zabrus veluchianus Apfelbeck, 1904

Species of beetle

Zabrus brevicollis is a species of ground beetle in the Pelor subgenus that is endemic to Greece.
