= Dorcadion robustum =

Scientific classification
- Kingdom: Animalia
- Phylum: Arthropoda
- Clade: Pancrustacea
- Class: Insecta
- Order: Coleoptera
- Suborder: Polyphaga
- Infraorder: Cucujiformia
- Family: Cerambycidae
- Genus: Dorcadion
- Species: D. robustum

Binomial name
- Dorcadion robustum Ganglbauer, 1883

Species of beetle

Dorcadion robustum is a species of beetle in the family Cerambycidae. It was described by Ludwig Ganglbauer in 1883.
