= Dorcadion litigiosum =

Scientific classification
- Kingdom: Animalia
- Phylum: Arthropoda
- Clade: Pancrustacea
- Class: Insecta
- Order: Coleoptera
- Suborder: Polyphaga
- Infraorder: Cucujiformia
- Family: Cerambycidae
- Genus: Dorcadion
- Species: D. litigiosum

Binomial name
- Dorcadion litigiosum Ganglbauer, 1884

Synonyms
- Pedestredorcadion litigiosum (Ganglbauer, 1884)

Species of beetle

Dorcadion litigiosum is a species of beetle in the family Cerambycidae. It was described by Ludwig Ganglbauer in 1884.

== Subspecies ==
- Dorcadion litigiosum litigiosum (Ganglbauer, 1884)
- Dorcadion litigiosum ostshakovi Suvorov, 1913
