= Maladera caspia =

Scientific classification
- Kingdom: Animalia
- Phylum: Arthropoda
- Class: Insecta
- Order: Coleoptera
- Suborder: Polyphaga
- Infraorder: Scarabaeiformia
- Family: Scarabaeidae
- Genus: Maladera
- Species: M. caspia

Binomial name
- Maladera caspia (Faldermann, 1836)

Synonyms
- Omaloplia caspia Faldermann, 1836; Serica caspia

Species of beetle

Maladera caspia is a species of beetle of the family Scarabaeidae. It is found in Kazakhstan and Russia.

== Description ==
Adults reach a length of about 6-6.5 mm. The pronotum is convex, the anterior margin not projecting in the middle, the sides only slightly rounded, wider posteriorly with distinct marginal setae, and the surface finely punctate. The scutellum is evenly punctate and finely pubescent. The elytra are punctate in rows, the rows of punctures are not very distinct, the punctures are fine and there are irregular punctures next to them and very scattered on the almost completely flat intervals. The pygidium is convex, densely, finely (often very finely) punctate at the apex.
