= Dorcadion angorense =

Scientific classification
- Kingdom: Animalia
- Phylum: Arthropoda
- Clade: Pancrustacea
- Class: Insecta
- Order: Coleoptera
- Suborder: Polyphaga
- Infraorder: Cucujiformia
- Family: Cerambycidae
- Genus: Dorcadion
- Species: D. angorense

Binomial name
- Dorcadion angorense Ganglbauer, 1897

Synonyms
- Dorcadion escherichi m. angorense (Ganglbauer) Breuning, 1962; Dorcadion escherichi var. posticedisjunctum Pic, 1909

Species of beetle

Dorcadion angorense is a species of beetle in the family Cerambycidae. It was described by Ludwig Ganglbauer in 1897. It is known from Turkey.
