= Carabus agnatus =

Scientific classification
- Domain: Eukaryota
- Kingdom: Animalia
- Phylum: Arthropoda
- Class: Insecta
- Order: Coleoptera
- Suborder: Adephaga
- Family: Carabidae
- Genus: Carabus
- Species: C. agnatus

Binomial name
- Carabus agnatus Ganglbauer, 1889

Synonyms
- Carabus agnatus Ganglbauer, 1889; Carabus kamberskyi Reitter, 1889 "Kuban"; Carabus jermolowi Starck, 1894 "Mt. Aishkha"; Carabus pseudagnatus Novotný & Voříšek, 1988

Species of beetle

Carabus agnatus is a species of black or purple-coloured beetle in the family Carabidae that is can be found in Georgia and Russia.
