= Zabrus foveolatus =

Scientific classification
- Domain: Eukaryota
- Kingdom: Animalia
- Phylum: Arthropoda
- Class: Insecta
- Order: Coleoptera
- Suborder: Adephaga
- Family: Carabidae
- Genus: Zabrus
- Subgenus: Zabrus (Pelor)
- Species: Z. foveolatus

Binomial name
- Zabrus foveolatus Schaum, 1864

Species of beetle

Zabrus foveolatus is a species of ground beetle in the Pterostichinae subfamily. It was described by Schaum in 1864 and is found in such Asian countries as Armenia and Turkey.
