= Zabrus melancholicus =

Scientific classification
- Domain: Eukaryota
- Kingdom: Animalia
- Phylum: Arthropoda
- Class: Insecta
- Order: Coleoptera
- Suborder: Adephaga
- Family: Carabidae
- Genus: Zabrus
- Subgenus: Zabrus (Pelor)
- Species: Z. melancholicus

Binomial name
- Zabrus melancholicus Schaum, 1864

Species of beetle

Zabrus melancholicus is a species of ground beetle in the Pterostichinae subfamily that can be found in such Asian countries as Armenia, Syria and Turkey.

== Subspecies ==
There are three subspecies of Z. melancholicus:

- Z. melancholicus heinzi Jedlička, 1965
- Z. melancholicus melancholicus Schaum, 1864
- Z. melancholicus occidentalis Freude, 1989
