= Zabrus lycius =

Scientific classification
- Domain: Eukaryota
- Kingdom: Animalia
- Phylum: Arthropoda
- Class: Insecta
- Order: Coleoptera
- Suborder: Adephaga
- Family: Carabidae
- Genus: Zabrus
- Subgenus: Zabrus (Pelor)
- Species: Z. lycius

Binomial name
- Zabrus lycius Ganglbauer, 1915

Species of beetle

Zabrus lycius is a species of ground beetle in the Pelor subgenus that can be found in Dodecanese islands and in Near East.
