= Zabrus foveipennis =

Scientific classification
- Kingdom: Animalia
- Phylum: Arthropoda
- Class: Insecta
- Order: Coleoptera
- Suborder: Adephaga
- Family: Carabidae
- Genus: Zabrus
- Subgenus: Zabrus (Pelor)
- Species: Z. foveipennis

Binomial name
- Zabrus foveipennis Heyden, 1883

Species of beetle

Zabrus foveipennis is a species of ground beetle in the Pterostichinae subfamily that is endemic to Turkey.
