= Zabrus apfelbecki =

Scientific classification
- Domain: Eukaryota
- Kingdom: Animalia
- Phylum: Arthropoda
- Class: Insecta
- Order: Coleoptera
- Suborder: Adephaga
- Family: Carabidae
- Genus: Zabrus
- Subgenus: Zabrus (Pelor)
- Species: Z. apfelbecki

Binomial name
- Zabrus apfelbecki Ganglbauer, 1915

Species of beetle

Zabrus apfelbecki is a species of ground beetle in the Pelor subgenus that is endemic to Bosnia and Herzegovina.
