= Zabrus puncticeps =

Scientific classification
- Domain: Eukaryota
- Kingdom: Animalia
- Phylum: Arthropoda
- Class: Insecta
- Order: Coleoptera
- Suborder: Adephaga
- Family: Carabidae
- Genus: Zabrus
- Subgenus: Zabrus (Polysitus)
- Species: Z. puncticeps

Binomial name
- Zabrus puncticeps Schaum, 1864

Species of beetle

Zabrus puncticeps is a species of ground beetle in the Polysitus subgenus that is endemic to Algeria.
