= Dorcadion eugeniae =

Scientific classification
- Kingdom: Animalia
- Phylum: Arthropoda
- Clade: Pancrustacea
- Class: Insecta
- Order: Coleoptera
- Suborder: Polyphaga
- Infraorder: Cucujiformia
- Family: Cerambycidae
- Genus: Dorcadion
- Species: D. eugeniae

Binomial name
- Dorcadion eugeniae Ganglbauer, 1885

Synonyms
- Pedestredorcadion eugeniae (Ganglbauer) Sama, 2002; Dorcadion peloponesium (Pic) Breuning, 1962

Species of beetle

Dorcadion eugeniae is a species of beetle in the family Cerambycidae. It was described by Ludwig Ganglbauer in 1885. It is known from Greece.

== Subspecies ==
- Dorcadion eugeniae emgei Ganglbauer, 1885
- Dorcadion eugeniae eugeniae Ganglbauer, 1885
