= Zabrus graecus =

Scientific classification
- Kingdom: Animalia
- Phylum: Arthropoda
- Class: Insecta
- Order: Coleoptera
- Suborder: Adephaga
- Family: Carabidae
- Genus: Zabrus
- Subgenus: Zabrus (Pelor)
- Species: Z. graecus

Binomial name
- Zabrus graecus Dejean, 1828

Synonyms
- Zabrus punctatostriatus Brullé, 1835; Zabrus puncticollis Brullé, 1835

Species of beetle

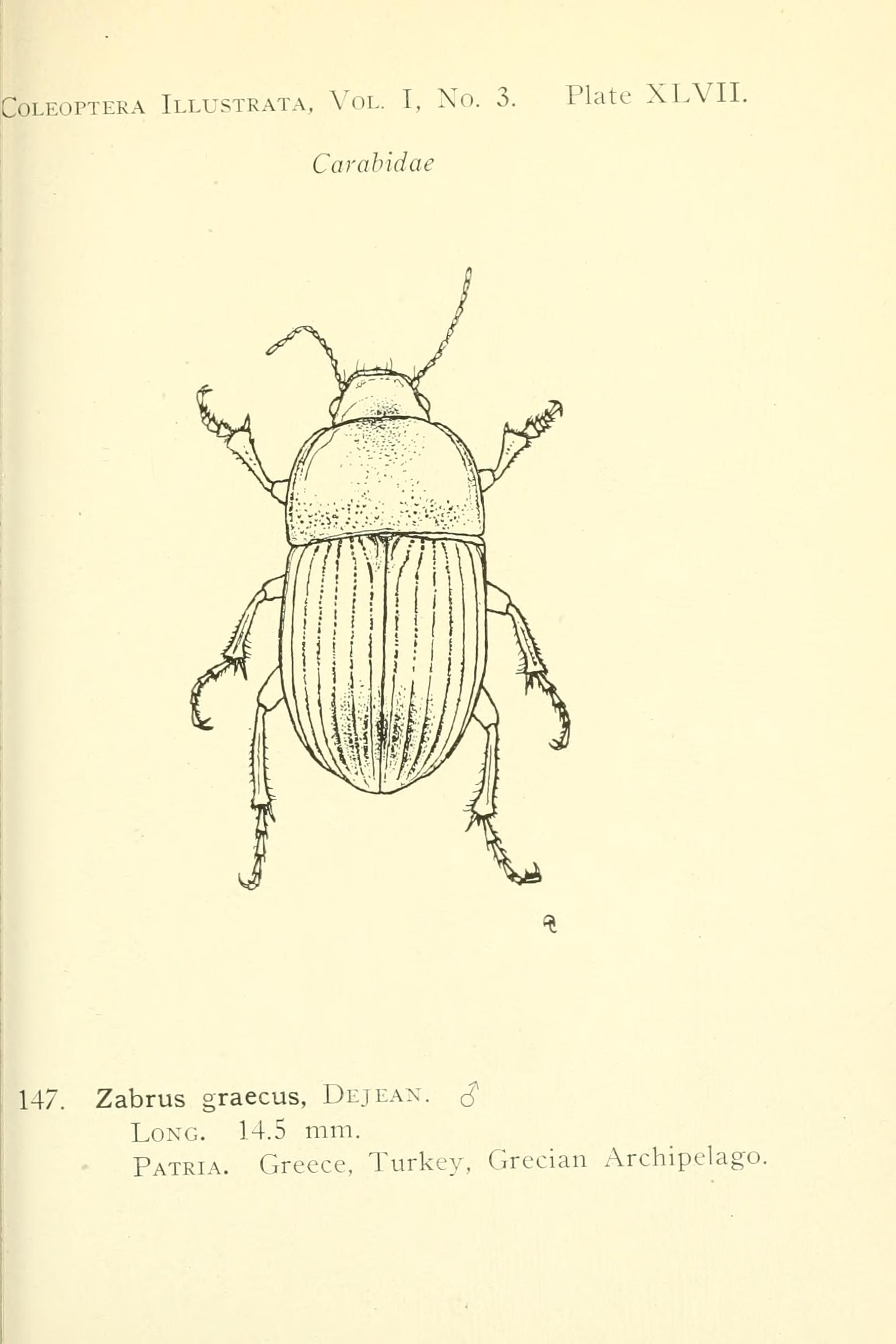
Zabrus graecus

Zabrus graecus is a species of ground beetle in the Pelor subgenus that is endemic to Greece.

== Subspecies ==
There are four subspecies of Z. graecus:

- Z. graecus convexus C. Zimmermann, 1831
- Z. graecus graecus Dejean, 1828
- Z. graecus orientalis Apfelbeck, 1904
- Z. graecus subtilis Schaum, 1862
