= Zabrus hellenicus =

Scientific classification
- Domain: Eukaryota
- Kingdom: Animalia
- Phylum: Arthropoda
- Class: Insecta
- Order: Coleoptera
- Suborder: Adephaga
- Family: Carabidae
- Genus: Zabrus
- Subgenus: Zabrus (Pelor)
- Species: Z. hellenicus

Binomial name
- Zabrus hellenicus Heyden, 1883

Species of beetle

Zabrus hellenicus is a species of ground beetle in the Pterostichinae subfamily that is endemic to Greece.
