= Maladera punctatissima =

Scientific classification
- Kingdom: Animalia
- Phylum: Arthropoda
- Clade: Pancrustacea
- Class: Insecta
- Order: Coleoptera
- Suborder: Polyphaga
- Infraorder: Scarabaeiformia
- Family: Scarabaeidae
- Genus: Maladera
- Species: M. punctatissima

Binomial name
- Maladera punctatissima (Faldermann, 1836)

Synonyms
- Omaloplia punctatissima Faldermann, 1836; Serica elata Küster, 1849; Omaloplia iberica Kolenati, 1846

Species of beetle

Maladera punctatissima is a species of beetle of the family Scarabaeidae. It is found in Armenia, Azerbaijan, Cyprus, Georgia, Iran, Israel, Lebanon, Russia, Turkey and Turkmenistan.

== Description ==
Adults reach a length of about 8.5-10.8 mm. They have a pitch- to blackish-brown or entirely black, strongly shiny, broad-oval body. The antennae and the hairs on the underside are rust-brown.
