= Zabrus reflexus =

Scientific classification
- Domain: Eukaryota
- Kingdom: Animalia
- Phylum: Arthropoda
- Class: Insecta
- Order: Coleoptera
- Suborder: Adephaga
- Family: Carabidae
- Genus: Zabrus
- Subgenus: Zabrus (Pelor)
- Species: Z. reflexus

Binomial name
- Zabrus reflexus Schaum, 1862

Species of beetle

Zabrus reflexus is a species of ground beetle in the Pelor subgenus that is endemic to Greece.
