= Dorcadion brenskei =

Scientific classification
- Kingdom: Animalia
- Phylum: Arthropoda
- Clade: Pancrustacea
- Class: Insecta
- Order: Coleoptera
- Suborder: Polyphaga
- Infraorder: Cucujiformia
- Family: Cerambycidae
- Genus: Dorcadion
- Species: D. brenskei

Binomial name
- Dorcadion brenskei Ganglbauer, 1883

Synonyms
- Dorcadion aeginasum Pic, 1942; Dorcadion minutum var. brenskei Ganglbauer, 1883; Dorcadion nemeense Breuning, 1974; Pedestredorcadion aeginasum (Pic) Sama, 2002; Pedestredorcadion nemeense (Breuning) Sama, 2002

Species of beetle

Dorcadion brenskei is a species of beetle in the family Cerambycidae. It was described by Ludwig Ganglbauer in 1883. It is known from Greece.
