= Zabrus validus =

Scientific classification
- Domain: Eukaryota
- Kingdom: Animalia
- Phylum: Arthropoda
- Class: Insecta
- Order: Coleoptera
- Suborder: Adephaga
- Family: Carabidae
- Genus: Zabrus
- Subgenus: Zabrus (Pelor)
- Species: Z. validus

Binomial name
- Zabrus validus Schaum, 1862

Synonyms
- Zabrus taygetanus Heyden, 1883

Species of beetle

Zabrus validus is a species of black coloured ground beetle in the Pterostichinae subfamily that is endemic to Greece.
