= Dorcadion escherichi =

Scientific classification
- Kingdom: Animalia
- Phylum: Arthropoda
- Clade: Pancrustacea
- Class: Insecta
- Order: Coleoptera
- Suborder: Polyphaga
- Infraorder: Cucujiformia
- Family: Cerambycidae
- Genus: Dorcadion
- Species: D. escherichi

Binomial name
- Dorcadion escherichi Ganglbauer, 1897

Synonyms
- Dorcadion egregium Ganglbauer, 1897

Species of beetle

Dorcadion escherichi is a species of beetle in the family Cerambycidae. It was described by Ludwig Ganglbauer in 1897. It is known from Turkey.

== See also ==
Dorcadion
