= Nebria retrospinosa =

Scientific classification
- Domain: Eukaryota
- Kingdom: Animalia
- Phylum: Arthropoda
- Class: Insecta
- Order: Coleoptera
- Suborder: Adephaga
- Family: Carabidae
- Genus: Nebria
- Species: N. retrospinosa

Binomial name
- Nebria retrospinosa Heyden, 1885

Species of beetle

Nebria retrospinosa is a species of ground beetle in the Nebriinae subfamily that can be found in Georgia and Russia.
