= Dorcadion hybridum =

Scientific classification
- Kingdom: Animalia
- Phylum: Arthropoda
- Clade: Pancrustacea
- Class: Insecta
- Order: Coleoptera
- Suborder: Polyphaga
- Infraorder: Cucujiformia
- Family: Cerambycidae
- Genus: Dorcadion
- Species: D. hybridum

Binomial name
- Dorcadion hybridum Ganglbauer, 1883

Synonyms
- Carinatodorcadion hybridum (Ganglbauer) Sama, 2002; Carinatodorcadion hybridum hedwigae (Jureček) Sama, 2002; Carinatodorcadion hybridum hybridum (Ganglbauer) Sama, 2002; Dorcadion fulvum var. hybridum (Ganglbauer) Kraatz, 1894; Dorcadion hedwigae Jureček, 1933; Dorcadion hybridum hedwigae (Jureček) Breuning, 1962; Dorcadion hybridum hybridum (Ganglbauer) Breuning, 1962

Species of beetle

Dorcadion hybridum is a species of beetle in the family Cerambycidae. It was described by Ludwig Ganglbauer in 1883. It is known from Greece and Turkey. It contains the varietas Dorcadion hybridum var. niveisuturale.
