= Zabrus balcanicus =

Scientific classification
- Kingdom: Animalia
- Phylum: Arthropoda
- Class: Insecta
- Order: Coleoptera
- Suborder: Adephaga
- Family: Carabidae
- Genus: Zabrus
- Subgenus: Zabrus (Pelor)
- Species: Z. balcanicus

Binomial name
- Zabrus balcanicus Heyden, 1883

Species of beetle

Zabrus balcanicus is a species of ground beetle in the subgenus Pelor, found in Bulgaria, Kosovo, Montenegro, North Macedonia, Serbia, Voivodina and Turkey.
