= Dorcadion corcyricum =

Scientific classification
- Kingdom: Animalia
- Phylum: Arthropoda
- Clade: Pancrustacea
- Class: Insecta
- Order: Coleoptera
- Suborder: Polyphaga
- Infraorder: Cucujiformia
- Family: Cerambycidae
- Genus: Dorcadion
- Species: D. corcyricum

Binomial name
- Dorcadion corcyricum Ganglbauer, 1883

Synonyms
- Pedestredorcadion corcyricum (Ganglbauer) Sama, 2002

Species of beetle

Dorcadion corcyricum is a species of longhorn beetle in the family Cerambycidae. It was described by Ludwig Ganglbauer in 1883. It is found in Greece.
