= Dorcadion granigerum =

Scientific classification
- Kingdom: Animalia
- Phylum: Arthropoda
- Clade: Pancrustacea
- Class: Insecta
- Order: Coleoptera
- Suborder: Polyphaga
- Infraorder: Cucujiformia
- Family: Cerambycidae
- Genus: Dorcadion
- Species: D. granigerum

Binomial name
- Dorcadion granigerum Ganglbauer, 1883

Synonyms
- Dorcadion divisum var. granigerum Ganglbauer, 1883; Pedestredorcadion granigerum (Ganglbauer) Sama, 2002

Species of beetle

Dorcadion granigerum is a species of beetle in the family Cerambycidae. It was described by Ludwig Ganglbauer in 1883. It is known from Greece.
