= Harpalus polyglyptus =

Scientific classification
- Kingdom: Animalia
- Phylum: Arthropoda
- Class: Insecta
- Order: Coleoptera
- Suborder: Adephaga
- Family: Carabidae
- Genus: Harpalus
- Species: H. polyglyptus

Binomial name
- Harpalus polyglyptus Schaum, 1862

Species of beetle

Harpalus polyglyptus is a species of ground beetle in the subfamily Harpalinae. It was described by Schaum in 1862.
