= Zabrus laevicollis =

Scientific classification
- Domain: Eukaryota
- Kingdom: Animalia
- Phylum: Arthropoda
- Class: Insecta
- Order: Coleoptera
- Suborder: Adephaga
- Family: Carabidae
- Genus: Zabrus
- Subgenus: Aulacozabrus
- Species: Z. laevicollis

Binomial name
- Zabrus laevicollis Schaum, 1864

Species of beetle

Zabrus laevicollis is a species of ground beetle in the Aulacozabrus subgenus that is endemic to Algeria.
