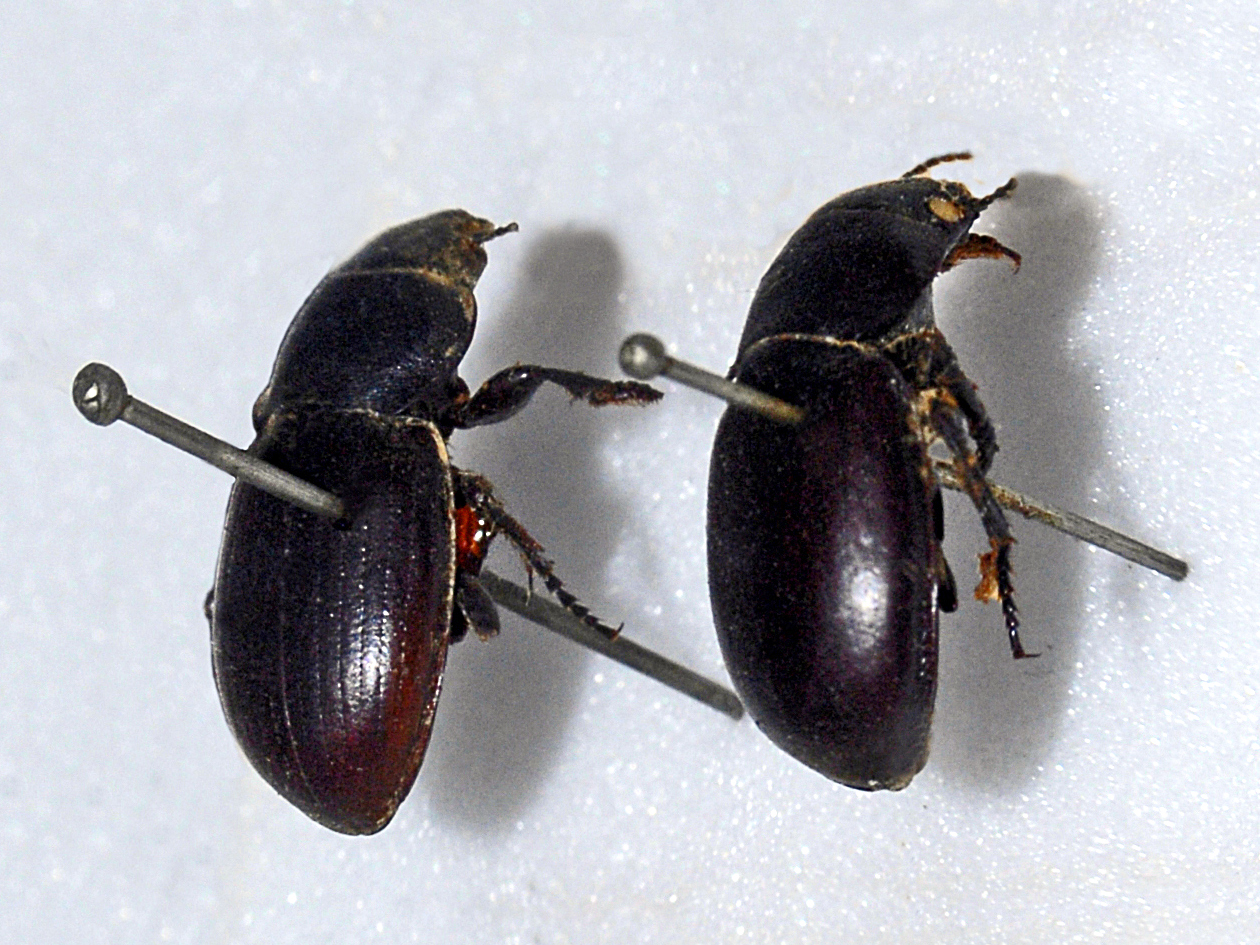
- Zabrus (Pelor) spinipes. Museum specimen

Scientific classification
- Kingdom: Animalia
- Phylum: Arthropoda
- Clade: Pancrustacea
- Class: Insecta
- Order: Coleoptera
- Suborder: Adephaga
- Family: Carabidae
- Genus: Zabrus
- Subgenus: Zabrus (Pelor)
- Species: Z. spinipes

Binomial name
- Zabrus spinipes (Fabricius, 1798)

Synonyms
- Pelor spinipes (Fabricius, 1798); Zabrus blapoides (Creutzer, 1799); Blaps spinipes Fabricius, 1798; Carabus blaptoides Creutzer, 1799

= Zabrus spinipes =

Species of beetle

Zabrus (Pelor) spinipes is a species of ground beetle belonging to the family Carabidae, genus Zabrus, subgenus Pelor.

== Subspecies ==
There are four subspecies of Z. spinipes:

- Zabrus spinipes insignis J. Müller, 1931
- Zabrus spinipes rugosus (Ménétries, 1832)
- Zabrus spinipes spinipes (Fabricius, 1798)
- Zabrus spinipes stevenii (Fischer von Waldheim, 1817)

== Description ==
Zabrus (Pelor) spinipes can reach a length of 17–21 millimetres (0.67–0.83 in). The head is large, almost oval. Elitrae are elongated, with light longitudinal striae. Body color is bright black.

== Distribution ==
This species can be found in Albania Austria, Bulgaria, Czech Republic, Greece Hungary, Moldova, Poland, North Macedonia, Slovakia, Ukraine, southern part of Russia (including Near East) and all states of former Yugoslavia (except for Croatia, Slovenia, Bosnia and Herzegovina).

== Gallery ==
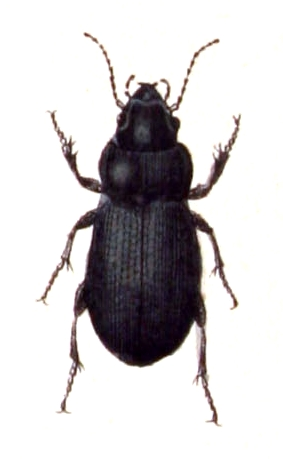
Zabrus spinipes

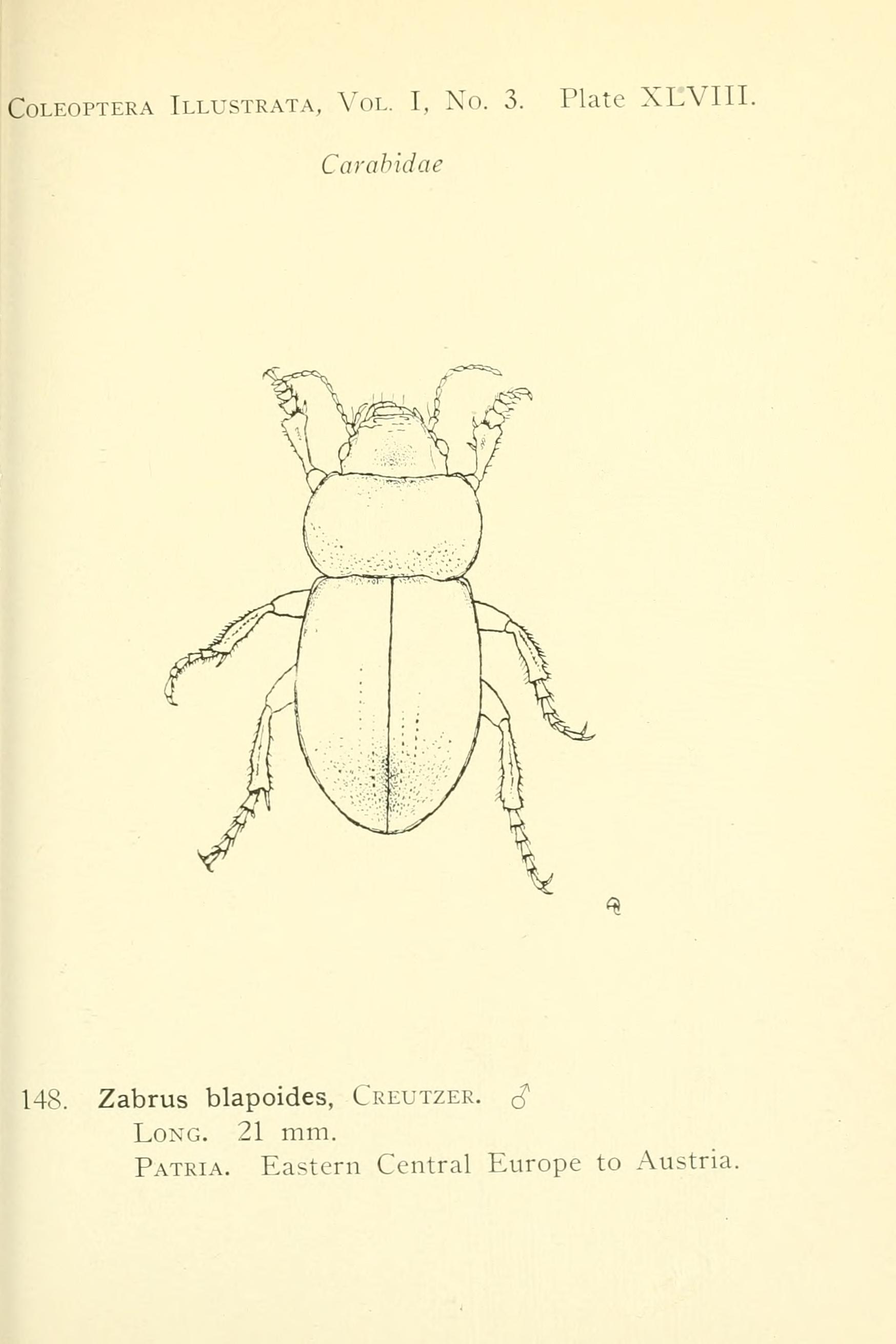
Z. spinipes from Coleoptera Illustrata

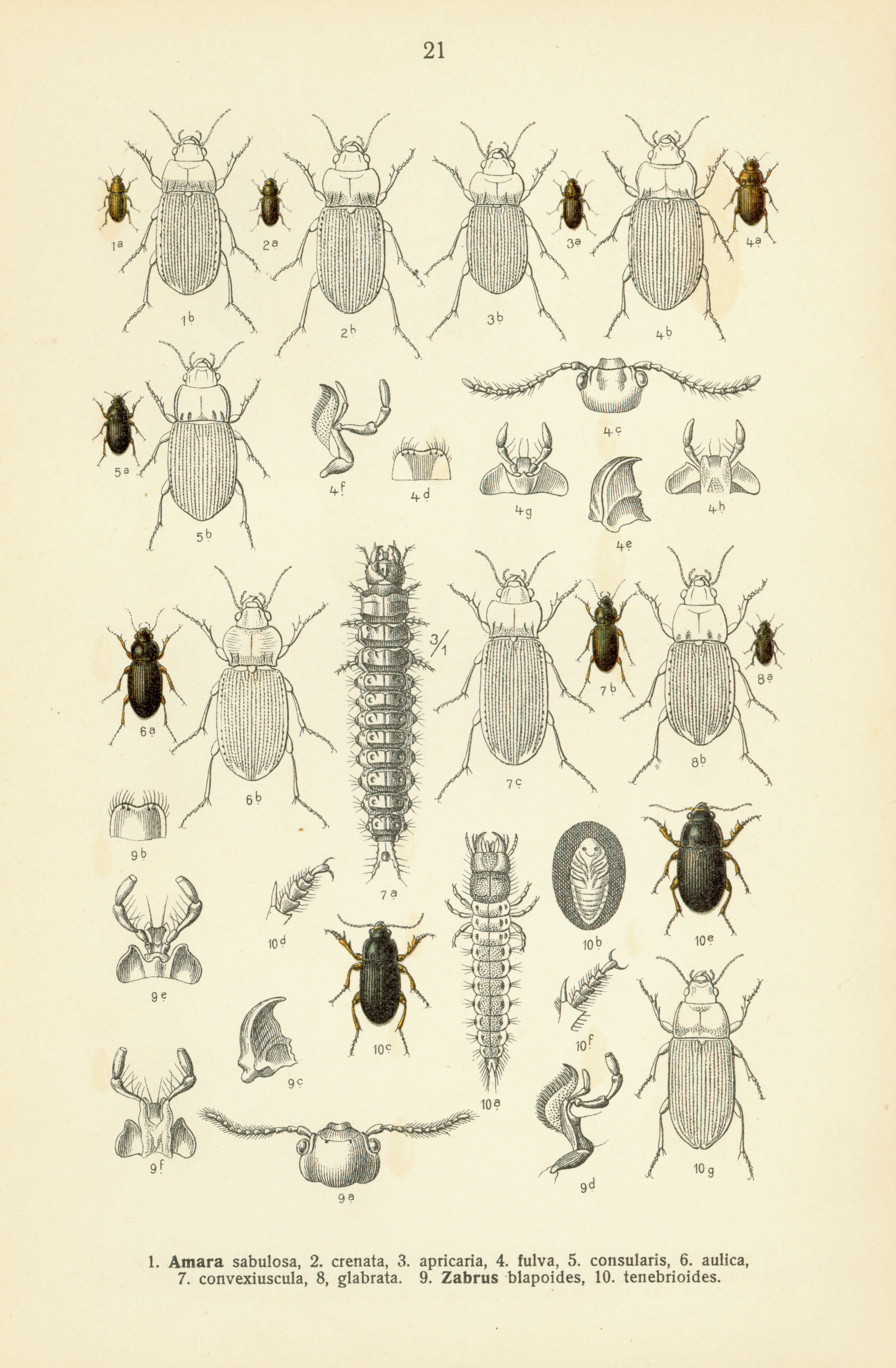
Z. spinipes from Fauna Germanica. ( 9a: head, 9b: labrum, 9c: mandible, 9d: maxilla)
