= Zabrus albanicus =

Scientific classification
- Domain: Eukaryota
- Kingdom: Animalia
- Phylum: Arthropoda
- Class: Insecta
- Order: Coleoptera
- Suborder: Adephaga
- Family: Carabidae
- Genus: Zabrus
- Subgenus: Zabrus (Pelor)
- Species: Z. albanicus

Binomial name
- Zabrus albanicus Apfelbeck, 1904

Species of beetle

Zabrus albanicus is a species ground beetle in the Pterostichinae subfamily that can be found in Albania (Prisren-Dieck) and all states of former Yugoslavia (except Croatia and Slovenia).

== Subspecies ==
There are four subspecies of Z. albanicus:

- Z. albanicus albanicus Apfelbeck, 1904
- Z. albanicus jablanicensis Maran, 1939
- Z. albanicus jakupicensis Maran, 1939
- Z. albanicus latifanus Ganglbauer, 1915
