= Zabrus estrellanus =

Scientific classification
- Domain: Eukaryota
- Kingdom: Animalia
- Phylum: Arthropoda
- Class: Insecta
- Order: Coleoptera
- Suborder: Adephaga
- Family: Carabidae
- Genus: Zabrus
- Subgenus: Zabrus (Iberozabrus)
- Species: Z. estrellanus

Binomial name
- Zabrus estrellanus Heyden, 1880

Species of beetle

Zabrus estrellanus is a species of ground beetle in the Iberozabrus subgenus that is endemic to Portugal.
