= Zabrus oertzeni =

Scientific classification
- Kingdom: Animalia
- Phylum: Arthropoda
- Class: Insecta
- Order: Coleoptera
- Suborder: Adephaga
- Family: Carabidae
- Genus: Zabrus
- Subgenus: Zabrus (Pelor)
- Species: Z. oertzeni

Binomial name
- Zabrus oertzeni Reitter, 1885

Synonyms
- Zabrus creticus Reitter, 1889; Zabrus leukaorensis Maran, 1947; Zabrus stepaneki Maran, 1947

Species of beetle

Zabrus oertzeni is a species of ground beetle in the Pelor subgenus that is endemic to Crete.

== Subspecies ==
There are four subspecies of Z. oertzeni:

- Z. oertzeni creticus Reitter, 1889
- Z. oertzeni leukaorensis Maran, 1947
- Z. oertzeni oertzeni Reitter, 1885
- Z. oertzeni stepaneki Maran, 1947
