= Zabrus maroccanus =

Scientific classification
- Domain: Eukaryota
- Kingdom: Animalia
- Phylum: Arthropoda
- Class: Insecta
- Order: Coleoptera
- Suborder: Adephaga
- Family: Carabidae
- Genus: Zabrus
- Subgenus: Zabrus (Pelor)
- Species: Z. maroccanus

Binomial name
- Zabrus maroccanus Reiche, 1864

Synonyms
- Zabrus prosternalis Antoine, 1933

Species of beetle

Zabrus maroccanus is a species of ground beetle in the Pelor subgenus that is endemic to Morocco, where it can be found in such provinces as Tangier, Rharb, Si Allel, Schou, and Tazi.
