= Zabrus jurjurae =

Scientific classification
- Domain: Eukaryota
- Kingdom: Animalia
- Phylum: Arthropoda
- Class: Insecta
- Order: Coleoptera
- Suborder: Adephaga
- Family: Carabidae
- Genus: Zabrus
- Subgenus: Zabrus (Lobozabrus)
- Species: Z. jurjurae

Binomial name
- Zabrus jurjurae Peyerimhoff, 1908

Species of beetle

Zabrus jurjurae is a species of ground beetle in the Lobozabrus subgenus that is endemic to Algeria.
