= Zabrus theveneti =

Scientific classification
- Kingdom: Animalia
- Phylum: Arthropoda
- Class: Insecta
- Order: Coleoptera
- Suborder: Adephaga
- Family: Carabidae
- Genus: Zabrus
- Subgenus: Zabrus (Iberozabrus)
- Species: Z. theveneti

Binomial name
- Zabrus theveneti Chevrolat, 1874

Species of beetle

Zabrus theveneti is a species of ground beetle in the Iberozabrus subgenus that is endemic to Spain (Andalusia).
