= Zabrus vasconicus =

Scientific classification
- Kingdom: Animalia
- Phylum: Arthropoda
- Class: Insecta
- Order: Coleoptera
- Suborder: Adephaga
- Family: Carabidae
- Genus: Zabrus
- Subgenus: Zabrus (Iberozabrus)
- Species: Z. vasconicus

Binomial name
- Zabrus vasconicus Uhagon, 1904

Species of beetle

Zabrus vasconicus is a species of black coloured ground beetle in the Iberozabrus subgenus that is endemic to Spain.

The species is 17 millimetres (0.67 in) in length.

== Distribution ==
The species is found in Pais Vasco, Aralar Range and Navarra regions of Spain.
