= Zabrus humeralis =

Scientific classification
- Domain: Eukaryota
- Kingdom: Animalia
- Phylum: Arthropoda
- Class: Insecta
- Order: Coleoptera
- Suborder: Adephaga
- Family: Carabidae
- Genus: Zabrus
- Subgenus: Zabrus (Epomidozabrus)
- Species: Z. humeralis

Binomial name
- Zabrus humeralis Uhagon, 1904

Species of beetle

Zabrus humeralis is a species of ground beetle in the Epomidozabrus subgenus that is endemic to Portugal.
