= Zabrus potanini =

Scientific classification
- Kingdom: Animalia
- Phylum: Arthropoda
- Class: Insecta
- Order: Coleoptera
- Suborder: Adephaga
- Family: Carabidae
- Genus: Zabrus
- Subgenus: Zabrus (Himalayozabrus)
- Species: Z. potanini

Binomial name
- Zabrus potanini Semenov, 1889

Species of beetle

Zabrus potanini is a species of ground beetle in the Himalayozabrus subgenus that is endemic to Gansu, China.
