= Zabrus ganglbaueri =

Scientific classification
- Domain: Eukaryota
- Kingdom: Animalia
- Phylum: Arthropoda
- Class: Insecta
- Order: Coleoptera
- Suborder: Adephaga
- Family: Carabidae
- Genus: Zabrus
- Subgenus: Zabrus (Pelor)
- Species: Z. ganglbaueri

Binomial name
- Zabrus ganglbaueri Apfelbeck, 1906

Species of beetle

Zabrus ganglbaueri is a species ground beetle in the Pterostichinae subfamily that can be found in Albania (Merdita) and North Macedonia.

== Subspecies ==
There are two subspecies of Z. ganglbaueri:

- Z. ganglbaueri ganglbaueri Apfelbeck, 1906
- Z. ganglbaueri lonae J. Muller, 1923
