= Zabrus pinguis =

Scientific classification
- Kingdom: Animalia
- Phylum: Arthropoda
- Class: Insecta
- Order: Coleoptera
- Suborder: Adephaga
- Family: Carabidae
- Genus: Zabrus
- Subgenus: Zabrus (Euryzabrus)
- Species: Z. pinguis

Binomial name
- Zabrus pinguis Dejean, 1831

Species of beetle

Zabrus pinguis is a 15 millimetres (0.59 in) long species of ground beetle in the Euryzabrus subgenus that can be found on Portugalian-Spanish border. The species is considered vulnerable in Spain under the IUCN Red List.
