= Zabrus ignavus =

Scientific classification
- Domain: Eukaryota
- Kingdom: Animalia
- Phylum: Arthropoda
- Class: Insecta
- Order: Coleoptera
- Suborder: Adephaga
- Family: Carabidae
- Genus: Zabrus
- Subgenus: Zabrus (Zabrus)
- Species: Z. ignavus

Binomial name
- Zabrus ignavus Csiki, 1907

Species of beetle

Zabrus ignavus is a species of ground beetle in the Pterostichinae subfamily that can be found in Bulgaria, France, Greece, Italy, Kosovo, Montenegro, Portugal, Serbia, Slovenia, Spain, Voivodina, on islands such as Balearic, Corsica, Gibraltar, Sardinia, and Sicily, and in Morocco.
