= Zabrus poggii =

Scientific classification
- Domain: Eukaryota
- Kingdom: Animalia
- Phylum: Arthropoda
- Class: Insecta
- Order: Coleoptera
- Suborder: Adephaga
- Family: Carabidae
- Genus: Zabrus
- Subgenus: Zabrus (Pelor)
- Species: Z. poggii

Binomial name
- Zabrus poggii Freude, 2002

Species of beetle

Zabrus poggii is a species of ground beetle in the Pterostichinae subfamily that is endemic to Syria.
