= Zabrus chiosanus =

Scientific classification
- Kingdom: Animalia
- Phylum: Arthropoda
- Class: Insecta
- Order: Coleoptera
- Suborder: Adephaga
- Family: Carabidae
- Genus: Zabrus
- Subgenus: Zabrus (Pelor)
- Species: Z. chiosanus

Binomial name
- Zabrus chiosanus Reitter, 1889

Species of beetle

Zabrus chiosanus is a species of ground beetle in the Pelor subgenus that is endemic to the North Aegean islands.
