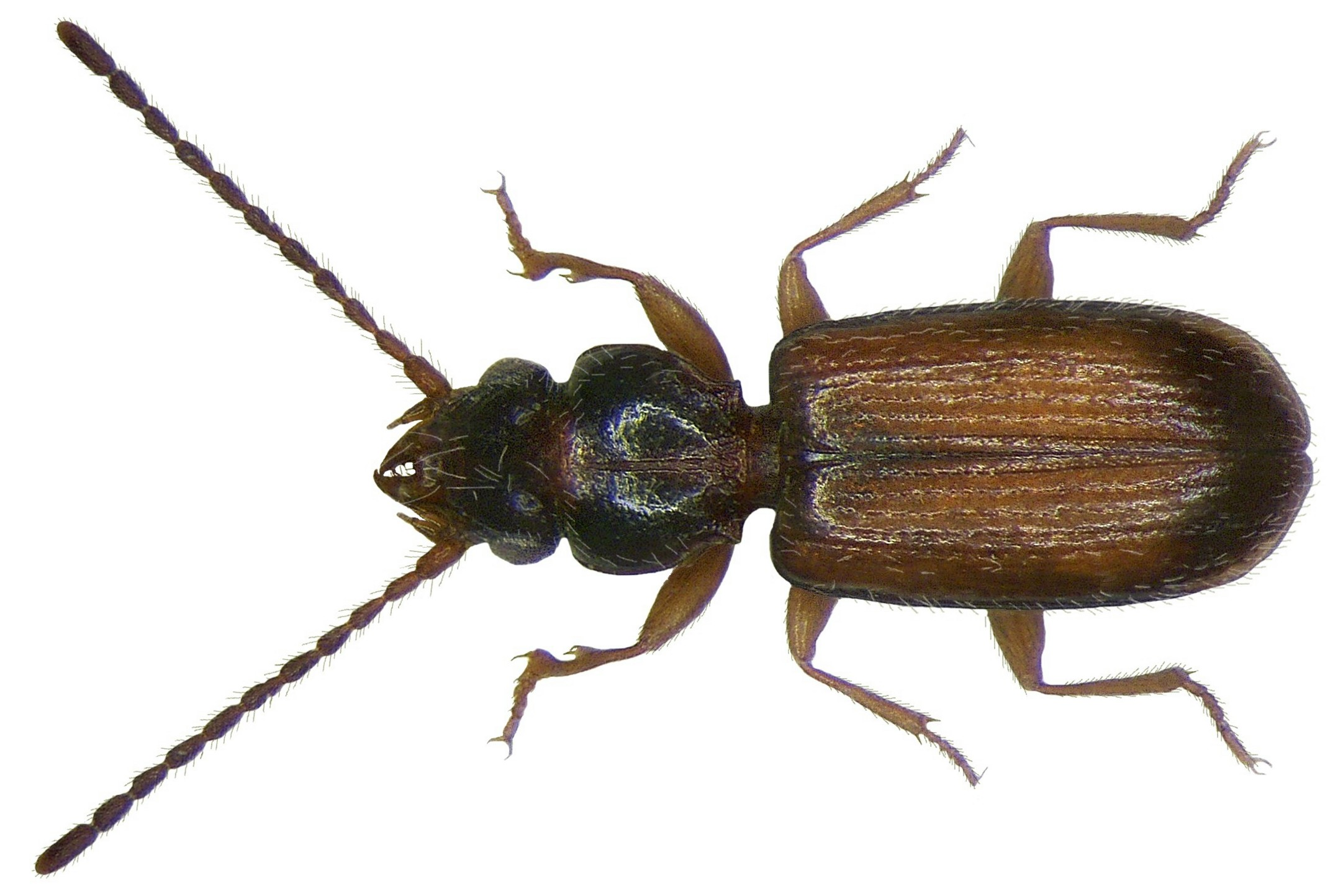

Scientific classification
- Kingdom: Animalia
- Phylum: Arthropoda
- Class: Insecta
- Order: Coleoptera
- Suborder: Adephaga
- Family: Carabidae
- Genus: Perileptus
- Species: P. areolatus

Binomial name
- Perileptus areolatus (Creutzer, 1799)

Synonyms
- Carabus areolatus Creutzer, 1799

= Perileptus areolatus =

Species of beetle

Perileptus areolatus is a species of brown coloured ground beetle in the Trechinae subfamily.

== Distribution ==
The species can be found everywhere in Europe except for Andorra, Finland, Lithuania, Monaco, San Marino and Vatican City. The species can also be found in Asia in such countries as Armenia, Azerbaijan, Georgia, Iran, Iraq, Israel, Saudi Arabia, Syria, Turkey, and in Africa in Tunisia and the Canary Islands. The species is 2.4–2.5 millimetres (0.094–0.098 in) in length.

=== Irish distribution ===
In Ireland the species is found in counties Kerry and Cork.

== Habitat ==
The species lives along riverine shingle.

== Threats and status ==
The species is classified as Nationally Scarce in Great Britain due to the habitat loss. The habitat loss includes the spread of invasive plants such as Himalayan Balsam, pollution, and floods due to engineering and dredging of the banks.
