= Zabrus asiaticus =

Scientific classification
- Domain: Eukaryota
- Kingdom: Animalia
- Phylum: Arthropoda
- Class: Insecta
- Order: Coleoptera
- Suborder: Adephaga
- Family: Carabidae
- Genus: Zabrus
- Subgenus: Zabrus (Pelor)
- Species: Z. asiaticus

Binomial name
- Zabrus asiaticus Laporte de Castelnau, 1834

Species of beetle

Zabrus asiaticus is a species of ground beetle in the Pelor subgenus. It was described by Francis de Laporte de Castelnau in 1834 and is found in Bulgaria, Greece, Romania, the North Aegean islands, European part of Turkey and the Near East.
