= Zabrus angustatus =

Scientific classification
- Domain: Eukaryota
- Kingdom: Animalia
- Phylum: Arthropoda
- Class: Insecta
- Order: Coleoptera
- Suborder: Adephaga
- Family: Carabidae
- Genus: Zabrus
- Subgenus: Zabrus (Iberozabrus)
- Species: Z. angustatus

Binomial name
- Zabrus angustatus Rambur, 1838

Species of beetle

Zabrus angustatus is a species of ground beetle in the Iberozabrus subgenus that can be found in Spain and Niger.
