= Zabrus punctifrons =

Scientific classification
- Kingdom: Animalia
- Phylum: Arthropoda
- Class: Insecta
- Order: Coleoptera
- Suborder: Adephaga
- Family: Carabidae
- Genus: Zabrus
- Subgenus: Zabrus (Pelor)
- Species: Z. punctifrons

Binomial name
- Zabrus punctifrons Fairmaire, 1866

Species of beetle

Zabrus punctifrons is a species of ground beetle in the Pelor subgenus that is endemic to Turkey.
