= Zabrus rotundicollis =

Scientific classification
- Domain: Eukaryota
- Kingdom: Animalia
- Phylum: Arthropoda
- Class: Insecta
- Order: Coleoptera
- Suborder: Adephaga
- Family: Carabidae
- Genus: Zabrus
- Subgenus: Zabrus (Pelor)
- Species: Z. rotundicollis

Binomial name
- Zabrus rotundicollis Ménétries, 1836

Synonyms
- Zabrus caramaniae Peyron, 1858

Species of beetle

Zabrus rotundicollis is a species of black coloured ground beetle in the Pelor subgenus that can be found in Armenia, Iran and Turkey.
