= Zabrus idaeus =

Scientific classification
- Kingdom: Animalia
- Phylum: Arthropoda
- Class: Insecta
- Order: Coleoptera
- Suborder: Adephaga
- Family: Carabidae
- Genus: Zabrus
- Subgenus: Zabrus (Pelor)
- Species: Z. idaeus

Binomial name
- Zabrus idaeus Schweiger, 1968

Species of beetle

Zabrus idaeus is a species of ground beetle in the Pterostichinae subfamily that is endemic to Turkey.
