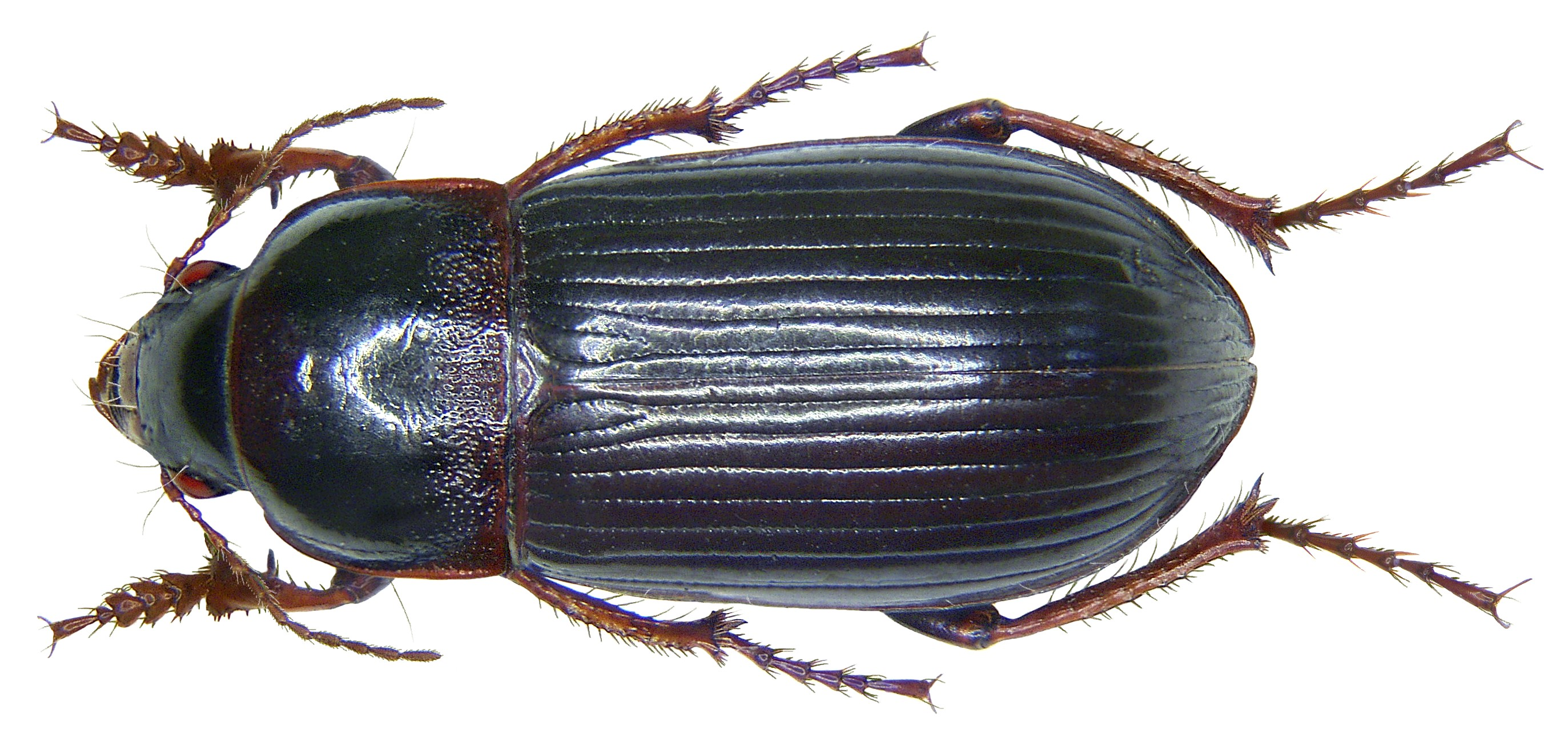

Scientific classification
- Domain: Eukaryota
- Kingdom: Animalia
- Phylum: Arthropoda
- Class: Insecta
- Order: Coleoptera
- Suborder: Adephaga
- Family: Carabidae
- Genus: Zabrus
- Subgenus: Zabrus (Zabrus)
- Species: Z. tenebrioides

Binomial name
- Zabrus tenebrioides (Goeze, 1777)

Synonyms
- Carabus gibbus Fabricius, 1794; Carabus tenebrioides Goeze, 1777

= Zabrus tenebrioides =

Species of beetle

Zabrus tenebrioides is a species of black coloured ground beetle in the Pterostichinae subfamily that can be found everywhere in Europe and the Near East.

Distributed in the steppe and forest-steppe to the southern border of Polesia. By its abundance and severity, the territory of Russia can be divided into two zones: the first zone-permanent, the second zone-cyclical damage.

The beetle is 12–16 millimetres (0.47–0.63 in) long, resinous with a weak metallic luster. Elytra convex, with deep grooves. The antennae, shanks and feet are dark brown.

Eggs measuring 2–2.5 mm, oval, milky white.

Larva up to 28 mm, has three ages, which differ in size of the head capsule and body. In larvae of the first age, the width of the head capsule is 1.1–1.2 millimetres (0.043–0.047 in), the second is 1.65-1.85, the third is 2.25–3.1 millimetres (0.089–0.122 in), the body length is 5–12, 10–20, 18–28 millimetres (0.71–1.10 in). The head and thoracic segments of the body of the larvae are dark-brown, the abdomen of larvae I, II, and in the middle of the third century are grayish, the larvae that finish feeding are white, and before pupation, they are cream-colored. Pupae of open type, white, are in an earthen cradle.
