= Zabrus costae =

Scientific classification
- Kingdom: Animalia
- Phylum: Arthropoda
- Clade: Pancrustacea
- Class: Insecta
- Order: Coleoptera
- Suborder: Adephaga
- Family: Carabidae
- Genus: Zabrus
- Subgenus: Zabrus (Italozabrus)
- Species: Z. costae

Binomial name
- Zabrus costae Schatzmayr, 1891

Synonyms
- Zabrus elongatus A. Costa, 1847; Zabrus magellensis A Fiori, 1899

Species of beetle

Zabrus costae is a species of ground beetle in the Pterostichinae subfamily that is endemic to Italy.
