= Zabrus semipunctatus =

Scientific classification
- Domain: Eukaryota
- Kingdom: Animalia
- Phylum: Arthropoda
- Class: Insecta
- Order: Coleoptera
- Suborder: Adephaga
- Family: Carabidae
- Genus: Zabrus
- Subgenus: Zabrus (Pelor)
- Species: Z. semipunctatus

Binomial name
- Zabrus semipunctatus Fairmaire, 1859

Synonyms
- Zabrus dispar Bonnaire, 1893

Species of beetle

Zabrus tenuestriatus is a species of ground beetle in the Pelor subgenus that can be found in Algeria and Tunisia.
