= Zabrus canaricus =

Scientific classification
- Kingdom: Animalia
- Phylum: Arthropoda
- Clade: Pancrustacea
- Class: Insecta
- Order: Coleoptera
- Suborder: Adephaga
- Family: Carabidae
- Genus: Zabrus
- Subgenus: Zabrus (Macarozabrus)
- Species: Z. canaricus

Binomial name
- Zabrus canaricus Machado, 1992

Species of beetle

Zabrus canaricus is a species of ground beetle in the Macarozabrus subgenus that is endemic to the Canary Islands.
