= Zabrus morio =

Scientific classification
- Domain: Eukaryota
- Kingdom: Animalia
- Phylum: Arthropoda
- Class: Insecta
- Order: Coleoptera
- Suborder: Adephaga
- Family: Carabidae
- Genus: Zabrus
- Subgenus: Zabrus (Zabrus)
- Species: Z. morio

Binomial name
- Zabrus morio Mandrias, 1832

Species of beetle

Zabrus morio is a species of ground beetle in the subfamily Pterostichinae. It is found in several Asian countries including Afghanistan, Armenia, Georgia, Iran, Kazakhstan, Pakistan, Syria, Turkmenistan, Turkey, and Uzbekistan.
