= Zabrus deflexicollis =

Scientific classification
- Kingdom: Animalia
- Phylum: Arthropoda
- Class: Insecta
- Order: Coleoptera
- Suborder: Adephaga
- Family: Carabidae
- Genus: Zabrus
- Subgenus: Zabrus (Polysitus)
- Species: Z. deflexicollis

Binomial name
- Zabrus deflexicollis Fairmaire, 1880

Species of beetle

Zabrus deflexicollis is a species of ground beetle in the Polysitus subgenus that is endemic to Morocco.
