= Zabrus laticollis =

Scientific classification
- Domain: Eukaryota
- Kingdom: Animalia
- Phylum: Arthropoda
- Class: Insecta
- Order: Coleoptera
- Suborder: Adephaga
- Family: Carabidae
- Genus: Zabrus
- Subgenus: Zabrus (Pelor)
- Species: Z. laticollis

Binomial name
- Zabrus laticollis Apfelbeck, 1904

Species of beetle

Zabrus laticollis is a species ground beetle in the Pelor subgenus that is can be found on Dodecanese islands and the Near East.
