= Zabrus guildensis =

Scientific classification
- Domain: Eukaryota
- Kingdom: Animalia
- Phylum: Arthropoda
- Class: Insecta
- Order: Coleoptera
- Suborder: Adephaga
- Family: Carabidae
- Genus: Zabrus
- Subgenus: Zabrus (Polysitus)
- Species: Z. guildensis

Binomial name
- Zabrus guildensis Alluaud, 1932

Species of beetle

Zabrus guildensis is a species of brown coloured ground beetle in the Polysitus subgenus that is endemic to Morocco.
