= Zabrus tenuestriatus =

Scientific classification
- Kingdom: Animalia
- Phylum: Arthropoda
- Class: Insecta
- Order: Coleoptera
- Suborder: Adephaga
- Family: Carabidae
- Genus: Zabrus
- Subgenus: Zabrus (Craspedozabrus)
- Species: Z. tenuestriatus

Binomial name
- Zabrus tenuestriatus Fairmaire, 1884

Species of beetle

Zabrus tenuestriatus is a species of ground beetle in the Craspedozabrus subgenus that is endemic to Morocco. The species was discovered by Léon Fairmaire in 1884 on Casablanca and was similar to Algerian Caelostomus distinctus.
