= Zabrus kurdistanicus =

Scientific classification
- Kingdom: Animalia
- Phylum: Arthropoda
- Class: Insecta
- Order: Coleoptera
- Suborder: Adephaga
- Family: Carabidae
- Genus: Zabrus
- Subgenus: Zabrus (Pelor)
- Species: Z. kurdistanicus

Binomial name
- Zabrus kurdistanicus Freude, 1989

Species of beetle

Zabrus kurdistanicus is a species of ground beetle in the Pelor subgenus that is endemic to Turkey.
