= Zabrus spectabilis =

Scientific classification
- Domain: Eukaryota
- Kingdom: Animalia
- Phylum: Arthropoda
- Class: Insecta
- Order: Coleoptera
- Suborder: Adephaga
- Family: Carabidae
- Genus: Zabrus
- Subgenus: Zabrus (Pelor)
- Species: Z. spectabilis

Binomial name
- Zabrus spectabilis Hampe, 1852

Species of beetle

Zabrus spectabilis is a species of greenish-black coloured ground beetle in the Pelor subgenus that can be found in Armenia, Iran, and Turkey. The species males are 14 millimetres (0.55 in) in length.
