= Zabrus mateui =

Scientific classification
- Kingdom: Animalia
- Phylum: Arthropoda
- Class: Insecta
- Order: Coleoptera
- Suborder: Adephaga
- Family: Carabidae
- Genus: Zabrus
- Subgenus: Zabrus (Epomidozabrus)
- Species: Z. mateui

Binomial name
- Zabrus mateui Novoa, 1980

Species of beetle

Zabrus mateui is a species of ground beetle in the Epomidozabrus subgenus that is endemic to Spain.
