= Zabrus inflatus =

Scientific classification
- Kingdom: Animalia
- Phylum: Arthropoda
- Class: Insecta
- Order: Coleoptera
- Suborder: Adephaga
- Family: Carabidae
- Genus: Zabrus
- Subgenus: Zabrus (Iberozabrus)
- Species: Z. inflatus

Binomial name
- Zabrus inflatus Dejean, 1828

Synonyms
- Zabrus dentipes Zimmermann, 1831

Species of beetle

Zabrus inflatus is a species of ground beetle in the Iberozabrus subgenus that can be found in France and Spain.
