= Zabrus sublaevis =

Scientific classification
- Kingdom: Animalia
- Phylum: Arthropoda
- Clade: Pancrustacea
- Class: Insecta
- Order: Coleoptera
- Suborder: Adephaga
- Family: Carabidae
- Genus: Zabrus
- Subgenus: Zabrus (Pelor)
- Species: Z. sublaevis

Binomial name
- Zabrus sublaevis Ménétries, 1836

Species of beetle

Zabrus sublaevis is a species of black coloured ground beetle in the Pelor subgenus that is endemic to Ankara, Turkey. The species males are 13 millimetres (0.51 in) long and can be found at an elevation of 1,100 metres (3,600 ft).
