= Zabrus femoratus =

Scientific classification
- Kingdom: Animalia
- Phylum: Arthropoda
- Class: Insecta
- Order: Coleoptera
- Suborder: Adephaga
- Family: Carabidae
- Genus: Zabrus
- Subgenus: Zabrus (Pelor)
- Species: Z. femoratus

Binomial name
- Zabrus femoratus Dejean, 1828

Species of beetle

Zabrus femoratus is a species of ground beetle in the Pelor subgenus. It was described by Dejean in 1828 and is found in Bulgaria, Greece, European part of Turkey and in Near East.
