= Zabrus constrictus =

Scientific classification
- Kingdom: Animalia
- Phylum: Arthropoda
- Class: Insecta
- Order: Coleoptera
- Suborder: Adephaga
- Family: Carabidae
- Genus: Zabrus
- Subgenus: Zabrus (Platyzabrus)
- Species: Z. constrictus

Binomial name
- Zabrus constrictus Graells, 1858

Species of beetle

Zabrus constrictus is a species of ground beetle in the Platyzabrus subgenus that is endemic to Spain.
