= Zabrus ovalis =

Scientific classification
- Domain: Eukaryota
- Kingdom: Animalia
- Phylum: Arthropoda
- Class: Insecta
- Order: Coleoptera
- Suborder: Adephaga
- Family: Carabidae
- Genus: Zabrus
- Subgenus: Zabrus (Pelor)
- Species: Z. ovalis

Binomial name
- Zabrus ovalis Fairmaire, 1859

Species of beetle

Zabrus ovalis is a species of ground beetle in the Pelor subgenus. It was described by Léon Fairmaire in 1859 and is found in Algeria and Tunisia.
