= Zabrus ambiguus =

Scientific classification
- Kingdom: Animalia
- Phylum: Arthropoda
- Class: Insecta
- Order: Coleoptera
- Suborder: Adephaga
- Family: Carabidae
- Genus: Zabrus
- Subgenus: Zabrus (Iberozabrus)
- Species: Z. ambiguus

Binomial name
- Zabrus ambiguus Rambur, 1838

Synonyms
- Zabrus crepidoderus Schaum, 1864; Zabrus crepidoderus Rambur, 1838

Species of beetle

Zabrus ambiguus is a species of ground beetle in the Iberozabrus subgenus that is endemic to Spain.
