= Phytoecia ganglbaueri =

Scientific classification
- Kingdom: Animalia
- Phylum: Arthropoda
- Clade: Pancrustacea
- Class: Insecta
- Order: Coleoptera
- Suborder: Polyphaga
- Infraorder: Cucujiformia
- Family: Cerambycidae
- Genus: Phytoecia
- Species: P. ganglbaueri

Binomial name
- Phytoecia ganglbaueri (Pic, 1936)

Synonyms
- Coptosia ganglbaueri Pic, 1936; Conizonia ganglbaueri – Breuning, 1954; Coptosia sancta Heyrovský, 1937

Species of beetle

Phytoecia ganglbaueri is a species of beetle in the family Cerambycidae. It was first described by Maurice Pic in 1936. It is known from southeastern Turkey, Cyprus, Israel, Jordan, Lebanon, Syria, and Iraq. It is named for Ludwig Ganglbauer.

Phytoecia ganglbaueri feed on Anchusa (including A. strigosa) and Echium. Adults measure 7–12 mm (0.28–0.47 in).
