= Zabrus distinctus =

Scientific classification
- Domain: Eukaryota
- Kingdom: Animalia
- Phylum: Arthropoda
- Class: Insecta
- Order: Coleoptera
- Suborder: Adephaga
- Family: Carabidae
- Genus: Zabrus
- Subgenus: Aulacozabrus
- Species: Z. distinctus

Binomial name
- Zabrus distinctus H. Lucas, 1842

Synonyms
- Zabrus contractus Fairmaire, 1859; Zabrus rotundipennis Fairmaire, 1859

Species of beetle

Zabrus distinctus is a species of ground beetle in the Aulacozabrus subgenus that can be found in Algeria and Morocco.
