= Zabrus pecoudi =

Scientific classification
- Kingdom: Animalia
- Phylum: Arthropoda
- Class: Insecta
- Order: Coleoptera
- Suborder: Adephaga
- Family: Carabidae
- Genus: Zabrus
- Subgenus: Zabrus (Platyzabrus)
- Species: Z. pecoudi

Binomial name
- Zabrus pecoudi Colas, 1942

Species of beetle

Zabrus pecoudi is a species of black coloured ground beetle in the Platyzabrus subgenus that is endemic to Spain. The species males are 13 millimetres (0.51 in) in length.
