= Zabrus martensi =

Scientific classification
- Domain: Eukaryota
- Kingdom: Animalia
- Phylum: Arthropoda
- Class: Insecta
- Order: Coleoptera
- Suborder: Adephaga
- Family: Carabidae
- Genus: Zabrus
- Subgenus: Zabrus (Himalayozabrus)
- Species: Z. martensi

Binomial name
- Zabrus martensi Freude, 1986

Species of beetle

Zabrus martensi is a species of ground beetle in the Himalayozabrus subgenus that is endemic to Nepal.
