= Zabrus fuentei =

Scientific classification
- Kingdom: Animalia
- Phylum: Arthropoda
- Class: Insecta
- Order: Coleoptera
- Suborder: Adephaga
- Family: Carabidae
- Genus: Zabrus
- Subgenus: Zabrus (Iberozabrus)
- Species: Z. fuentei

Binomial name
- Zabrus fuentei Anichtchenko & Ruiz-Tapiador, 2008

Species of beetle

Zabrus fuentei is a species of black coloured ground beetle in the Iberozabrus subgenus that is endemic to Spain. The species is dedicated to the Spanish entomologist José María de la Fuente.
