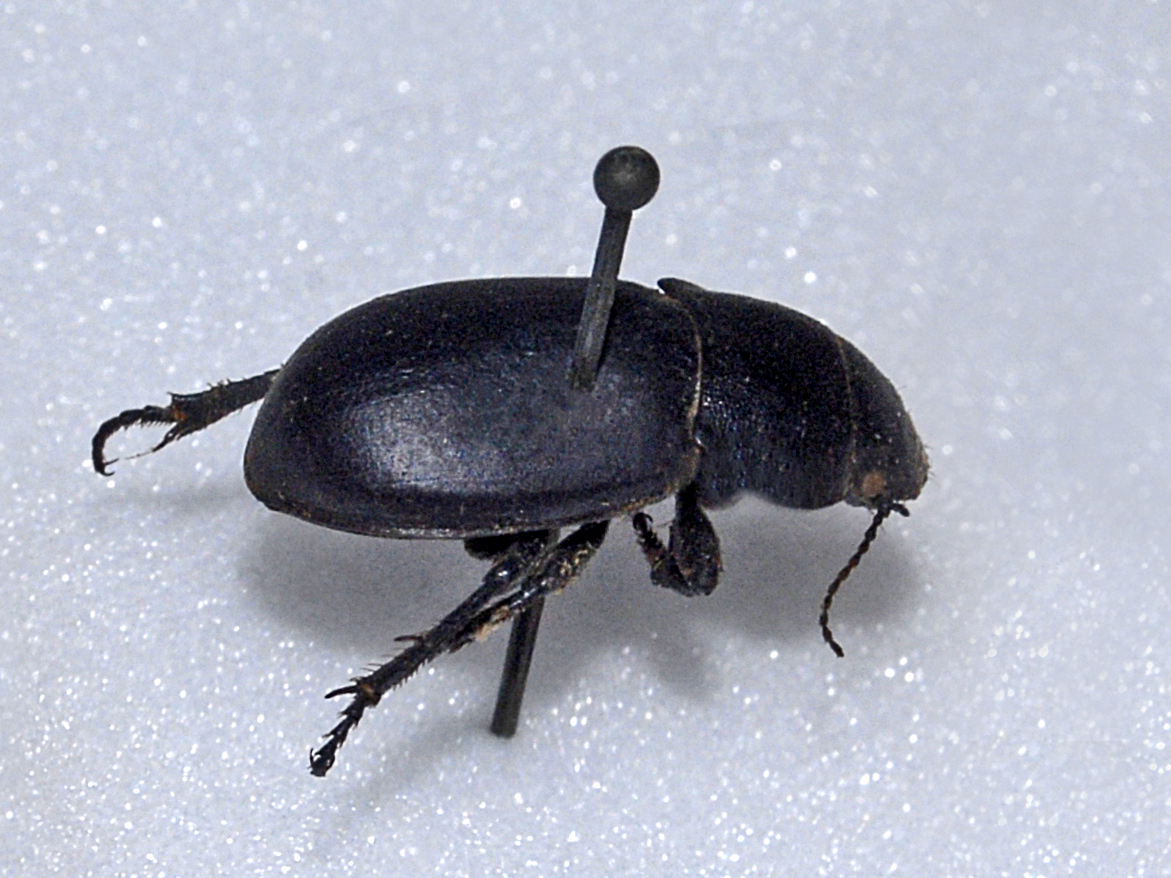
- Zabrus incrassatus. Museum specimen

Scientific classification
- Kingdom: Animalia
- Phylum: Arthropoda
- Class: Insecta
- Order: Coleoptera
- Suborder: Adephaga
- Family: Carabidae
- Genus: Zabrus
- Subgenus: Zabrus (Pelor)
- Species: Z. incrassatus

Binomial name
- Zabrus incrassatus (Ahrens, 1814)

Synonyms
- Zabrus incrassatus incrassatus (Ahrens, 1814); Zabrus incrassatus tuleschkovi Maran, 1933

= Zabrus incrassatus =

Species of beetle

Zabrus incrassatus is a species of beetle in the family Carabidae.

== Description ==
Zabrus incrassatus can reach a length of 14–16 millimetres (0.55–0.63 in). The head is large. Elitrae are elongated, with light longitudinal striae. Body color is bright black.

== Distribution ==
This species is present in Albania, Belgium, Bulgaria, Croatia, Greece, Macedonia, former Yugoslavia and in the Near East.
