= Zabrus crassus =

Scientific classification
- Kingdom: Animalia
- Phylum: Arthropoda
- Clade: Pancrustacea
- Class: Insecta
- Order: Coleoptera
- Suborder: Adephaga
- Family: Carabidae
- Genus: Zabrus
- Subgenus: Zabrus (Macarozabrus)
- Species: Z. crassus

Binomial name
- Zabrus crassus Dejean, 1828

Synonyms
- Zabrus bajamarensis Freude, 1986

Species of beetle

Zabrus crassus is a species of ground beetle in the Macarozabrus subgenus that is endemic to the Canary Islands.
