= Francisco de Paula Martínez =

Spanish zoologist

Francisco de Paula Martínez, member of the Pacific scientific commission.

Francisco de Paula Martínez y Sáez (March 30, 1835 – 1908) was a Spanish zoologist.
