= Josef Müller (entomologist) =

Croatian entomologist (1880–1964)

- Born: 24 April 1880; Zadar, Kingdom of Dalmatia, Austria-Hungary
- Died: 21 September 1964 (aged 84); Trieste, Italy
- Education: University of Graz
- Scientific career
- Fields: Zoology, Entomology
- Workplaces: Museo Civico di Storia Naturale di Trieste
- Author abbrev. (zoology): Müller

Josef Müller (24 April 1880 – 21 September 1964), also known as Giuseppe Müller, was a Croatian entomologist.

== Life ==
Josef Müller was born in 1880 in Zadar, at the time part of the Austro-Hungarian Empire. In school, he acquired solid knowledge of the classical languages, as well as of the scientific method.

In 1898, he moved to Graz and studied natural history in the faculty of philosophy, concluding his studies in 1902. His dissertation was about the morphology of land planarians. In 1900, he won the University of Graz's "Unger Prize" for a work on the anatomy of the roots of exotic orchids. At this time he met many Austrian entomologists, such as Ludwig Ganglbauer.

After his doctor examination, Müller moved to Trieste, where he started teaching natural history in Trieste High School and joined the Società Adriaca de Scienze Naturali. Later, he and other entomologists founded an entomology club and developed a comprehensive work program. This led him to study the arthropod fauna found in caves of the Trieste region, especially blind insects. After presenting his results at the International Congress of Zoology in Graz, he became known in larger circles and started many scientific cooperations. One of his most notable works at the time was his monography on blind ground beetles, the "Monographie der blinden Trechen der Ostalpen und Balkanhalbinsel", for which he was awarded the Ganglbauer Prize.

During World War I, his work was interrupted and he was drafted into the military service. There, his entomological knowledge proved to be valuable in the control of diseases transmitted by insects. He spent his first year in an anti-malaria station in Albania and later was invited to the bacteriological laboratory in Vienna. In his study on the body louse, he proved that the bacteria Rickettsia prowazekii, known to cause epidemic typhus, is transmitted by the insect.

In 1921, Müller became the conservator of the Natural History Museum in Trieste, and two years later became the director of the museum and of the botanical gardens. From 1930 to 1940, he traveled several times to North Africa to collect and study beetles of the family Histeridae. He also planned the construction of an aquarium in Trieste, which included many coral fish from Red Sea and that was opened in 1933. He left the museum in 1946 due to his age.

He died in Trieste in 1964, aged 84.

== Work ==
Most of Müller's work was focused on beetles, especially carabid beetles, and he described 757 new insect taxa, including many new genera. He also studied other animal groups, such as pseudoscorpions, crustaceans, reptiles and birds of prey.

Selected works:

- Müller, Josef (1900). "Über neue und bekannte Histeriden". Wiener entomologische Zeitung. 19: 137–142. doi:10.5962/bhl.part.3448.
- Müller, Josef (1900). "Über die Anatomie der Assimilationswurzeln von Taeniophylum Zollingeri". Akadamie der Wissenschaften in Wien. 109 (1): 1–17.
- Müller, Josef (1901). "Beitrag zur Kenntnis der Höhlensilphiden". Verhandlungen der K.k. Zoologisch-botanischen Gesellschaft. 51: 16–33.
- Müller, Josef (1901). "Coccinellidae Dalmatiae". Verhandlungen der K.k. Zoologisch-botanischen Gesellschaft. 51: 511–522.
- Müller, Josef (1902). "Lucanidae et Scarabaeidae Dalmatiae". Verhandlungen der K.k. Zoologisch-botanischen Gesellschaft. 52: 438–466.
- Müller, Josef (1903). "Ein Beitrag zur Kenntnis der Bipaliiden". Zeitschrift für Wissenschaftliche Zoologie. 73: 75–114.
- Müller, Josef (1903). "Beschreibungen neuer dalmatinischer Kolopteren I. Teil". Münchener koleopterologische Zeitschrift. 1: 192–194.
- Müller, Josef (1903). "Bericht über die Koleopterenausbeute des Herrn R. Galvagni auf den dalmatischen Inseln Pelagosa, Lissa und Lagosta". Verhandlungen der K.k. Zoologisch-botanischen Gesellschaft. 53: 10–17.
- Müller, Josef (1903). "Über neue Höhlenkäfer aus Dalmatien". Sitzungsberichte der Kaiserl. Akademie des Wissenschaften. Mathem.-naturw. Klasse. 112 (1): 870–889.
- Müller, Josef (1903). "Sulla fauna delle caverne. Considerazioni generali e note critiche". Bollettino della Società Adriatica di scienze naturali. 21: 139–194.
- Müller, Josef (1906). "Cerambycidae Dalmatiae". Verhandlungen der K.k. Zoologisch-botanischen Gesellschaft. 56: 653–695.
- Müller, Josef (1909). "Sechs neue Höhlenkäfer aus den südlichen Kalkalpen, dem istro-dalmatinischen Karstgebiet und dem Balkan". VWiener entomologische Zeitung. 28: 273–282.
- Müller, Josef (1909). "Georyssidae, Dryopidae, Heteroceridae et Hydrophilidae Dalmatiae". Verhandlungen der K.k. Zoologisch-botanischen Gesellschaft. 59: 456–485.
- Müller, Josef (1916). "Coleopterologische Beiträge zur Fauna der österreischischen Karstprovinzen und ihre Grenzgebiete". Entomologische Blätter. 12: 73–109.
- Müller, Josef; Pick, R. (1916). "Experimentelle Untersuchungen über Typhusbazillen und Kleiderläuse". Wiener klinische Wochenschrift. 29 (14).
- Müller, Josef; Urizio, L. (1919). "Sulla trasmissione del dermotifo mediante le deiezioni dei pidochi infetti". Riforma Medica. 35: 1–8.
