= Maximilien Chaudoir =

Russian entomologist (1816–1881)

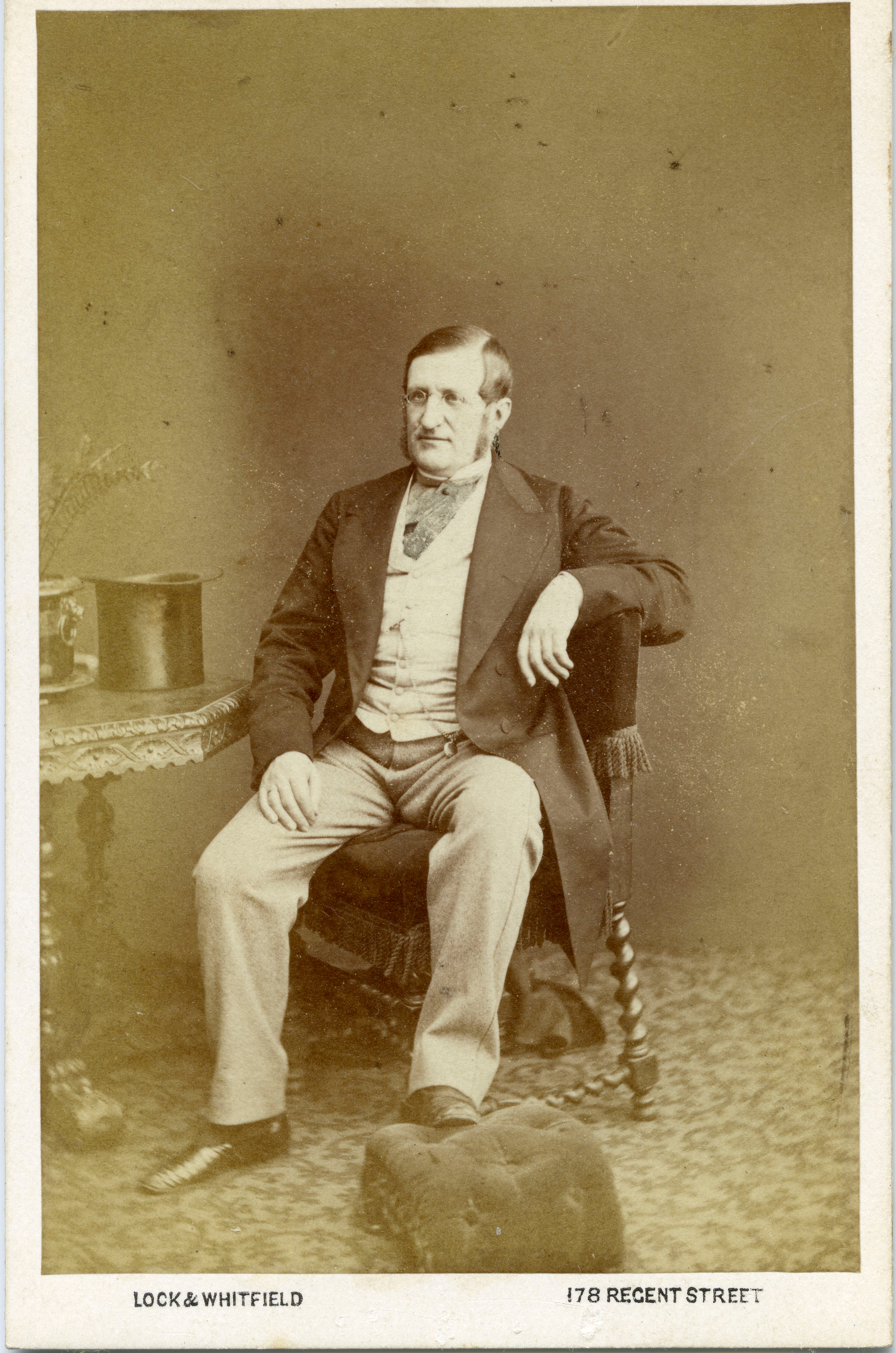
Carte de visite, c. 1865

Maximilien Chaudoir, or Maximilien, baron de Chaudoir (Russian: Максимилиан де Шодуар; 12 September 1816 – 6 May 1881), was a Russian entomologist. He was a specialist in Coleoptera and in particular the Carabidae. His Cicindelidae are conserved by the Muséum national d'histoire naturelle in Paris. His Carabidae were acquired by Charles Oberthür (1845–1924), then given to the same museum. He wrote Mémoire sur la famille des Carabiques, 6 volumes commencing 1848.

== Life and work ==
Chaudoir was born in the village of Ivnytsia, located about 30 kilometres from Zhitomir in the Russian Empire. The family may come from a line of French or Belgian Protestant emigrants who fled in 1685. The later roots have been traced to Antoine de Chaudoire from Poland whose son worked in the court of Stanislas-Auguste Poniatowski until his abdication in 1795, after which he moved to Bavaria where he received the hereditary title of Baron from Maximilien Joseph II in 1814. His son Stanislav (1790–1858) married Aglae d'Erggelet and Maximilien was their only son. Stanislav was a wealthy collector who donated his books and collectibles to the Hermitage Museum. Maximilien was raised by his aunt as his mother died after his birth. Jean Wavre, a private tutor introduced him to natural history and insects. He began collecting carabid beetles in 1826. He was sent to study law at Tartu (Dorpat), although not interested in law, he knew that Johann Friedrich von Eschscholtz taught zoology there. Eschscholtz died a few weeks before he joined the university, and Chaudoir began to work on his collections at the museum. He was encouraged by Count Gustave de Mannerheim, and in 1834, he travelled around Germany and met Louis Chevrolat in Hamburg. He became a member of the Entomological Society of France in 1834, later moving to Kiev and joining the Societe Imperiale des Naturlistes de Moscou in 1837. In 1845, Chaudoir visited Crimea and became interested in the Caucasus region. In 1847 he became a member of the Entomologische Verein, Stettin. In 1848, he bought the Franz Faldermann collection followed by another collection of Himalayan beetles from Captain W. E. Boys in 1850 and still later Hippolyte Louis Gory's collection in 1852.

He married Elisabeth-Augusta Bockshanine on February 28, 1856. They had a daughter and a son. However, his daughter Marie died in 1879 at the age of 22 from tuberculosis. Chaudoir died from a stroke on 6 May 1881 and was buried next to his daughter in their family vault at Amelie-Bains-Palalda. His wife died in 1896 at Zhitomir and their son died without issue in 1919. Before his death, he let his collection be available to René Oberthür through his friend Charles Oberthür. This collection eventually went to the Muséum national d'Histoire naturelle in Paris.

== Sources ==
- "Шодуар, Максимилиан" . Brockhaus and Efron Encyclopedic Dictionary (in Russian). 1906.
