= Lucas Friedrich Julius Dominikus von Heyden =

German entomologist (1838–1915)

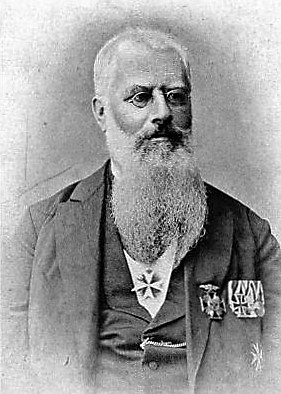
Lucas von Heyden (1908)

Lucas Friedrich Julius Dominikus von Heyden (22 May 1838, Frankfurt – 13 September 1915, Frankfurt) was a German entomologist specialising in beetles (Coleoptera). He wrote with Edmund Reitter and Julius Weise Catalogus coleopterorum Europae, Caucasi et Armeniae rossicae. Edn 2. Berlin, Paskau, Caen (1902). He also worked with his father Carl von Heyden on fossil insects.

== Life and work ==
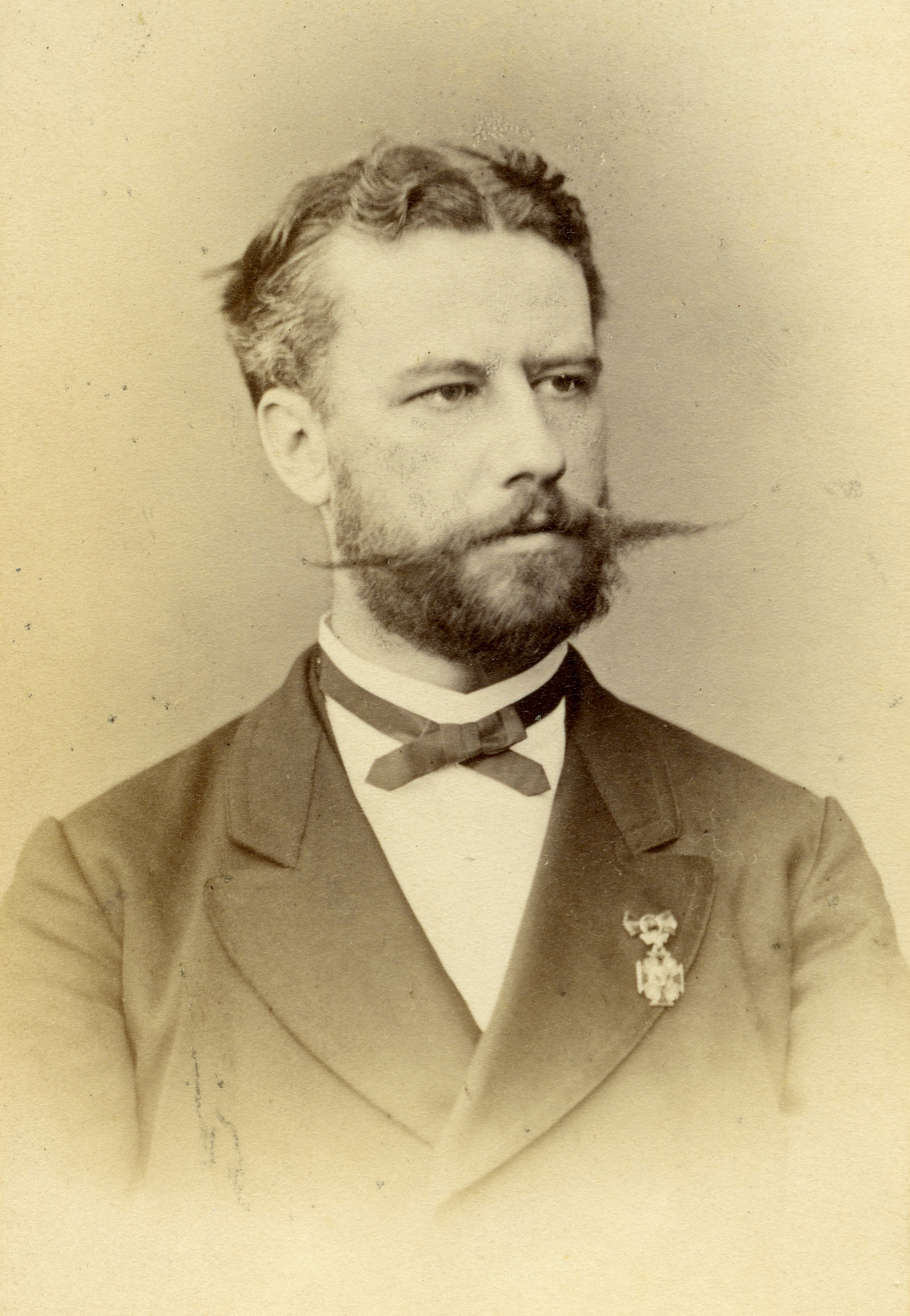
In 1870

Von Heyden was the son of senator Carl von Heyden who was also interested in entomology. He had a sister Julie and a brother Hermann von Heyden who became chamberlain to the Duke of Saxony. He graduated from high school in Frankfurt and joined the Frankfurt Infantry Battalion. He became a company commander in 1865 and retired the next year but volunteered again in 1870 to serve in the Prussian army during the Franco-Prussian War. He received an Iron Cross 11h Class and then spent most of his life dedicated to entomological research. From 1868 to 1870 he travelled in Spain and Portugal in the company of Charles Jacob Piochard de la Brûlerie (1845–1876). In 1878 he travelled to Croatia and Slavonia with Baron von Hopffgarten and Ritter to collect insects. He received an honorary doctorate from the University of Bonn in 1875. He collected extensively across insect group in these travels and nearly 200 species from across the insect orders have been named after him. He described at least 500 new taxa on his own. In 1901 he was titled as a professor by the Prussian state. He was a member of numerous entomological societies. He contributed to economic entomology with studies on Phylloxera and his beetle collections were extensive as was his collection of literature. Along with Reitter and Weise he worked on the Catalogus coleopterum, a catalogue of the beetles of the Palearctic. He donated his library to the Senckenberg Society of Frankfurt.

Von Heyden married Baroness Hermine Riedesel zu Eisenbach und Altenburg in 1816 but she died two years later. After this he lived with his sister Julie who took care of him until his death.
