= Franz Faldermann =

German entomologist (1799–1838)

Franz Faldermann (28 February 1799, Heidelberg – 30 November 1838, St. Petersburg) was a German entomologist who specialised in Coleoptera.

Falderman described many new taxa of Coleoptera. His major works are:

- Faldermann, F.: 1833, Species novae Coleopterorum Mongoliae et Sibiriae; Bulletin de la Société Impériale des Naturalistes de Moscou, 6: 46 - 72.
- Faldermann, F.: 1835, Fauna Entomologica Transcaucasica; 1. časť tvoria nasledovné diela: Additamenta Entomologica ad Faunam Rossicam - Coleoptera Persico-Armeniaca; Nouveaux Mémoires de la Société Impériale des Naturalistes de Moscou, 4: 1 - 314.
- Faldermann, F. 1835, Coleopterorum ab. ill. Bungio in China boreali, Mongolia et montibus Altaicis collectorum, nec non ab ill. Turczaninoffio et Stschukino e provincia Irkutzk missorum illustrationes; Mémoires de l'Académie Impériale des Sciences de St. Pétersbourg, (6)2: 337 - 464.
- Faldermann, F.: 1836, Bereicherung der Käferkunde des Russischen Reiches; Bull. Soc. Nat., M.
- Faldermann, F.: 1837, Fauna Entomologica Trans-caucasica; Pars II. Nouv. Mem. Soc. Nat. Mosc., 5: 1 - 412, pl. I - XV.
- Faldermann, F.: 1838, Fauna Entomologica Transcaucasica; 3. časť tvoria nasledovné diela: Additamenta Entomologica ad Faunam Rossicam - Coleoptera Persico-Armeniaca; Nouveaux Mémoires de la Société Impériale des Naturalistes de Moscou, 6 338 pp.
- Faldermann, F.: 1835—1838, Fauna entomologica transcaucasica; (3 т.)

His insect collections are shared between the Zoological Museum of the Zoological Institute of the Russian Academy of Sciences in St. Petersburg, the Muséum national d'histoire naturelle in Paris, Kiev Polytechnic Institute and the Zoological Museum of Moscow University
