= Hermann Rudolph Schaum =

German entomologist (1819–1865)

Hermann Rudolph Schaum (29 April 1819 – 15 September 1865) was a German entomologist and professor in Berlin. He specialised in Coleoptera.

== Life and career ==
Schaum was born on 29 April 1819 in Glauchau. Up until 1847, he worked as a general practitioner in Stettin (now Szczecin, Poland), afterwards traveling to England, North America and Egypt, where he accumulated an impressive collection of insects. He later served as a professor of entomology at the University of Berlin. On 15 September 1865, he died in Bonn from consequences of a stroke.

The beetle species Diochus schaumi is named after him. Schaum was a member of the Entomological Society of Stettin.

== Selected works ==
- "Analecta entomologica", 1841.
- Verzeichniss der Lamellicornia mélitophila, 1841.
- "Catalogus coleopterorum Europae", 1852 - Catalog of European Coleoptera.
- Naturgeschichte der Insecten Deutschlands, (from 1860, with Wilhelm Ferdinand Erichson, Ernest August Hellmuth von Kiesenwetter and Ernst Gustav Kraatz) - Natural history of German entomology.
- Necrophilus arenarius Roux, die mutmassliche Larve von Nemoptera, 1860 - "Necrophilus arenarius", the alleged larvae of Nemoptera.
- "Descriptions of four new genera of Carabidae" (English translation in 1863).
- "Contributions to the knowledge of the Cicindelidae of tropical Asia containing descriptions of new species, a list of those hitherto described, and synonymical notes, (English translation in 1866).
