= Ludwig Ganglbauer =

Austrian entomologist (1856–1912)

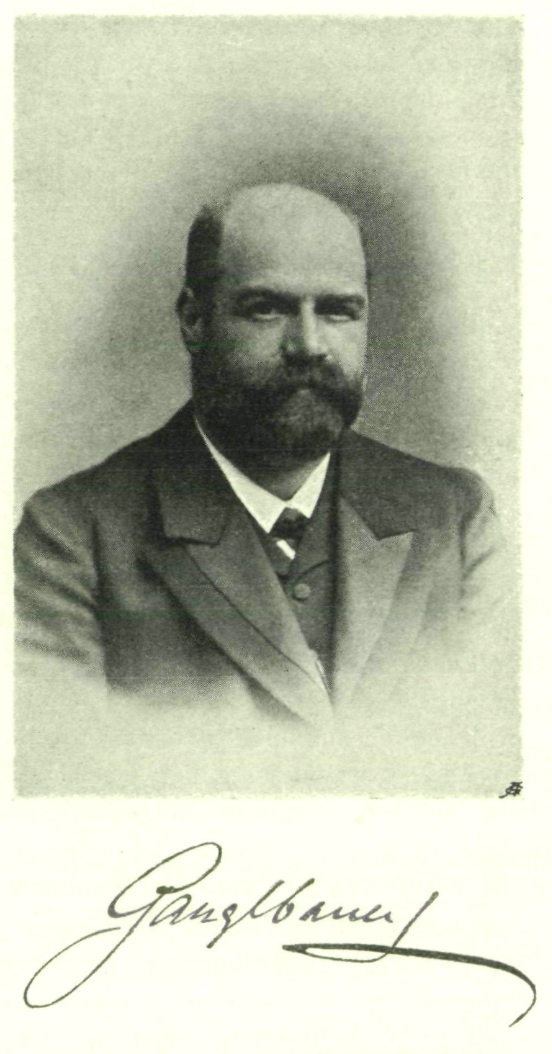

Ludwig Ganglbauer (1 October 1856, in Vienna – 5 June 1912, in Rekawinkel, near Kaltenbach Lower Austria), was an Austrian entomologist who specialised in Coleoptera (i.e., beetles) of Europe.

== Life and work ==
Ganglbauer became interested in insects during early childhood. Educated at the Schottengymnasium in Vienna, he later obtained a teaching certificate from the University of Vienna, and then taught high school for a few years. He subsequently took a job at the Wiener Hofmuseum (now the Vienna Museum of Natural History). He encouraged a circle of entomologists in Vienna that met on the first and third Thursdays of each month at a restaurant.

In 1881, he co-founded the journal Wiener Entomologische Zeitung. He became director of the Department for Zoology at the Vienna Natural History Museum in 1906. Ganglbauer wrote Die Käfer von Mitteleuropa (Beetles of Central Europe), 4 vols., 1892–1904 which was unfinished at his death, but is still widely read by entomologists. Ganglbauer enjoyed puns and when his friends Breit and Tax collected a new species of Anophthalmus in Transylvania they suggested that it be named Anophthalmus taxi but since that name was preoccupied Ganglbauer suggested autotaxi which would also indicate that Tax had collected it himself.

=== Publications ===
- Die Käfer von Mitteleuropa (Vol. 1–4, 1892–1904)

== Legacy ==
Species named in honour of Ludwig Ganglbauer:

- Phytoecia ganglbaueri, a beetle
