= Theodor von Brand =

German-American parasitologist

Theodor von Brand (born September 22, 1899, in Ortenberg, Baden-Württemberg; died July 19, 1978, in Bethesda, Maryland), full name Theodor Kurt Freiherr von Brand zu Neidstein, was a German American parasitologist.

Theodor von Brand is a descendant of the German noble family von Brand. His mother Diana von Brandt was a née Freiin von Hirsch from a Jewish German noble family.

He studied zoology and medicine and attained a doctorate in both sciences. He was an assistant of Ernst Weinland at the University of Erlangen-Nuremberg and went to the Bernhard Nocht Institute for Tropical Medicine in 1929. Because of his views opposing the National-Socialist-Party and due to maternal Jewish descent, he was forced to leave the institute in 1933 and went to Copenhagen. In 1935 he immigrated into the USA. He was among the first scientists making biochemical experiments with parasites at the Johns Hopkins University. 1947 he became leader of a department at the National Institutes of Health in Bethesda, Maryland.

He is an initial researcher of the biochemistry and metabolism of parasites of the groups of helminths and protozoa.

In 1978 he was honoured with the Robert Koch Medal.

His son Theodor P. von Brand (1926–2004) became an administrative law judge in the USA.

== Publications ==
- Biochemistry of Parasites, Academic Press 1966, 2. Edition 1973
- Chemical physiology of endoparasitic animals, Academic Press 1952
- Biochemistry and physiology of endoparasites, North Holland/Elsevier 1979

== Sources ==
- Obituary in the Zeitschrift für Parasitenkunde, Volume 58, 1978, S. 1
- Geschichte des Bernhard Nocht Instituts (History of the Bernhard Nocht Institute for Tropical Medicine) (PDF)
