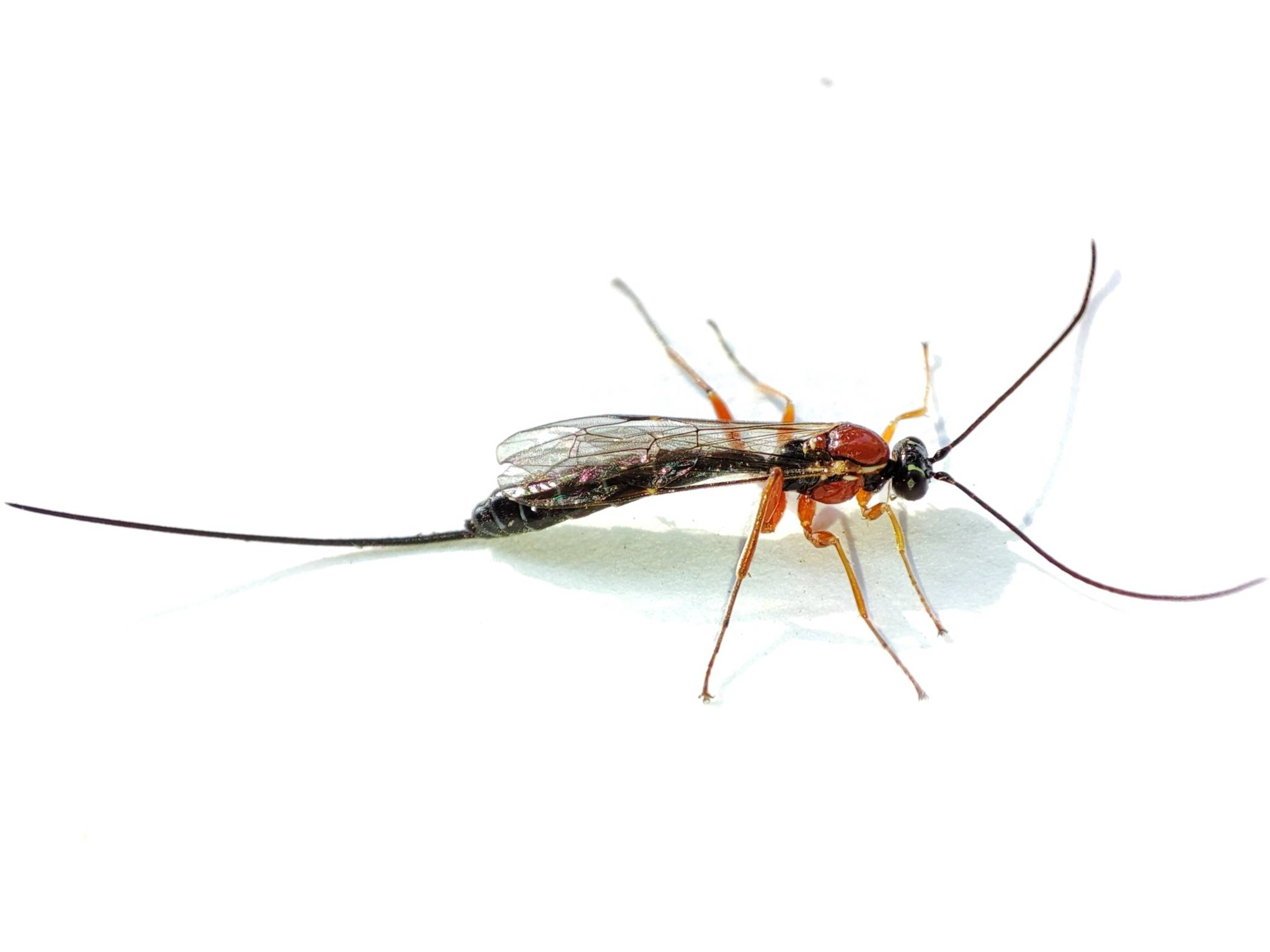

Scientific classification
- Kingdom: Animalia
- Phylum: Arthropoda
- Clade: Pancrustacea
- Class: Insecta
- Order: Hymenoptera
- Family: Ichneumonidae
- Genus: Perithous
- Species: P. scurra

Binomial name
- Perithous scurra (Panzer, 1804)

Synonyms
- Perithous mediator (Fabricius, 1804)

= Perithous scurra =

Species of wasp

Perithous scurra is a species of ichneumon wasp in the tribe Delomeristini.

== Subspecies ==
These five subspecies belong to the species Perithous scurra:

- Perithous scurra japonicus Uchida, 1928^{c g}
- Perithous scurra neomexicanus (Viereck, 1903)^{b}
- Perithous scurra nigrinotum Uchida, 1942^{c g}
- Perithous scurra pleuralis Cresson, 1868^{b}
- Perithous scurra scurra^{g}

Data sources: i = ITIS, c = Catalogue of Life, g = GBIF, b = Bugguide.net

== Gallery ==
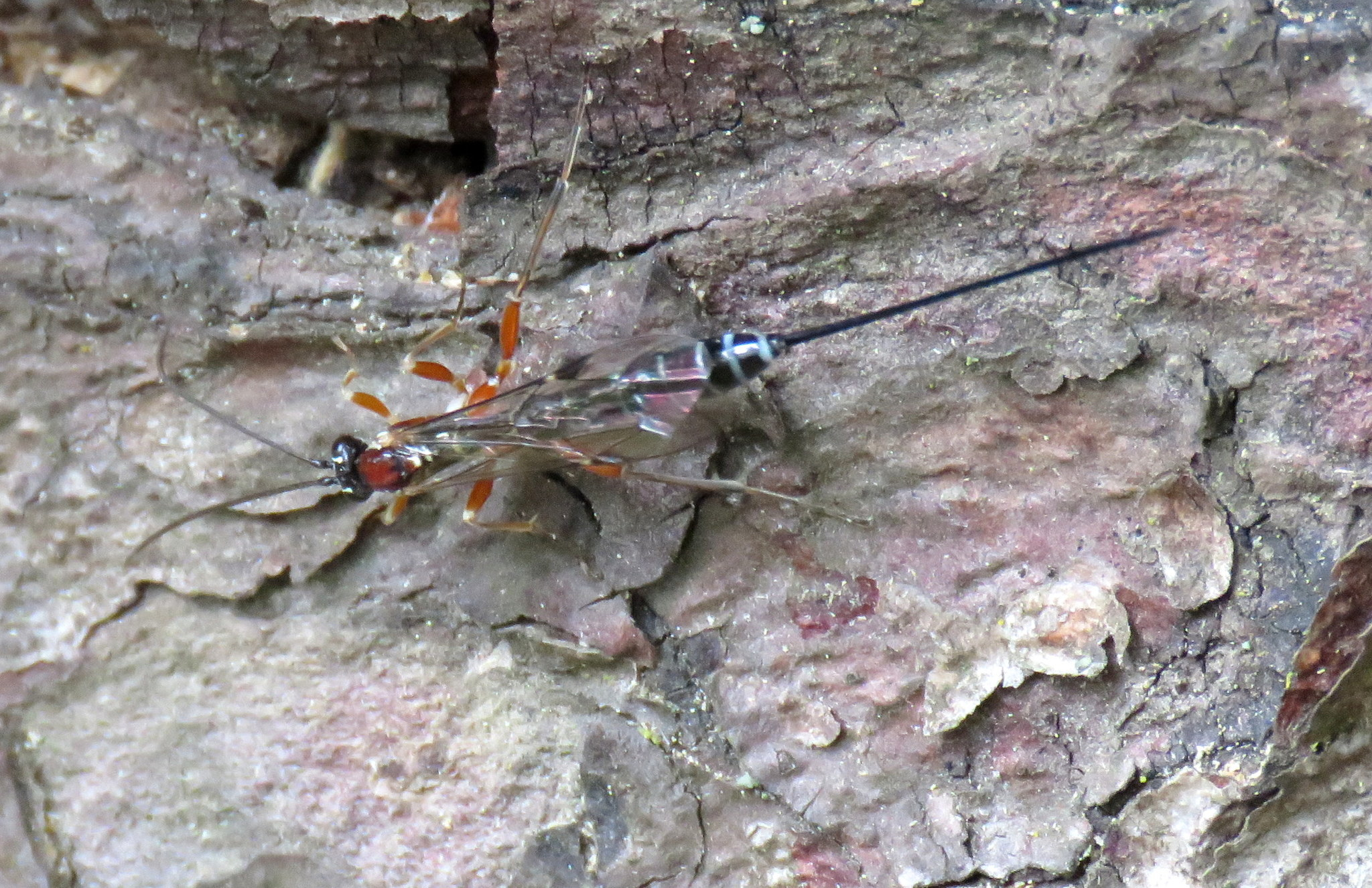
P. scurra neomexicanus

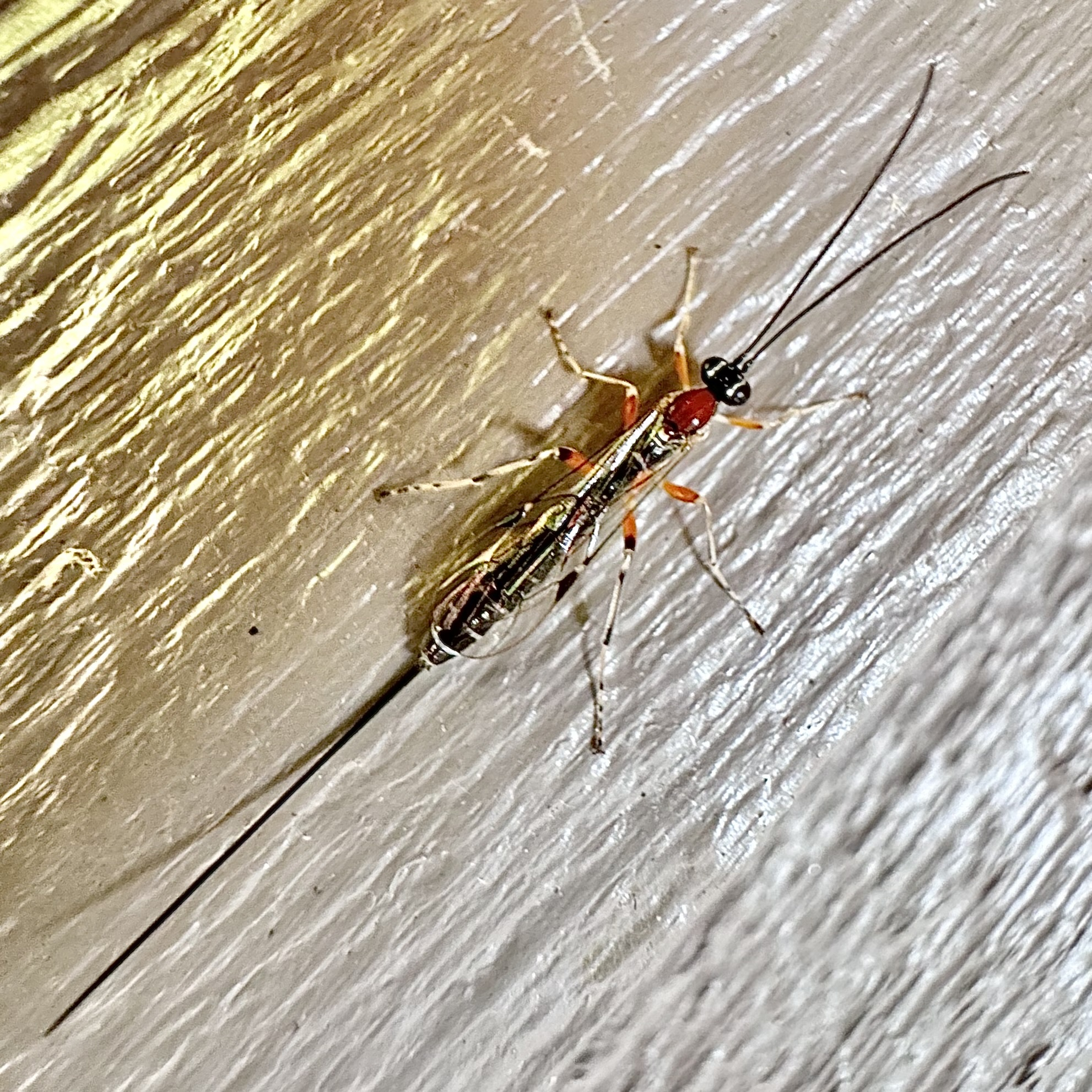
P. scurra pleuralis

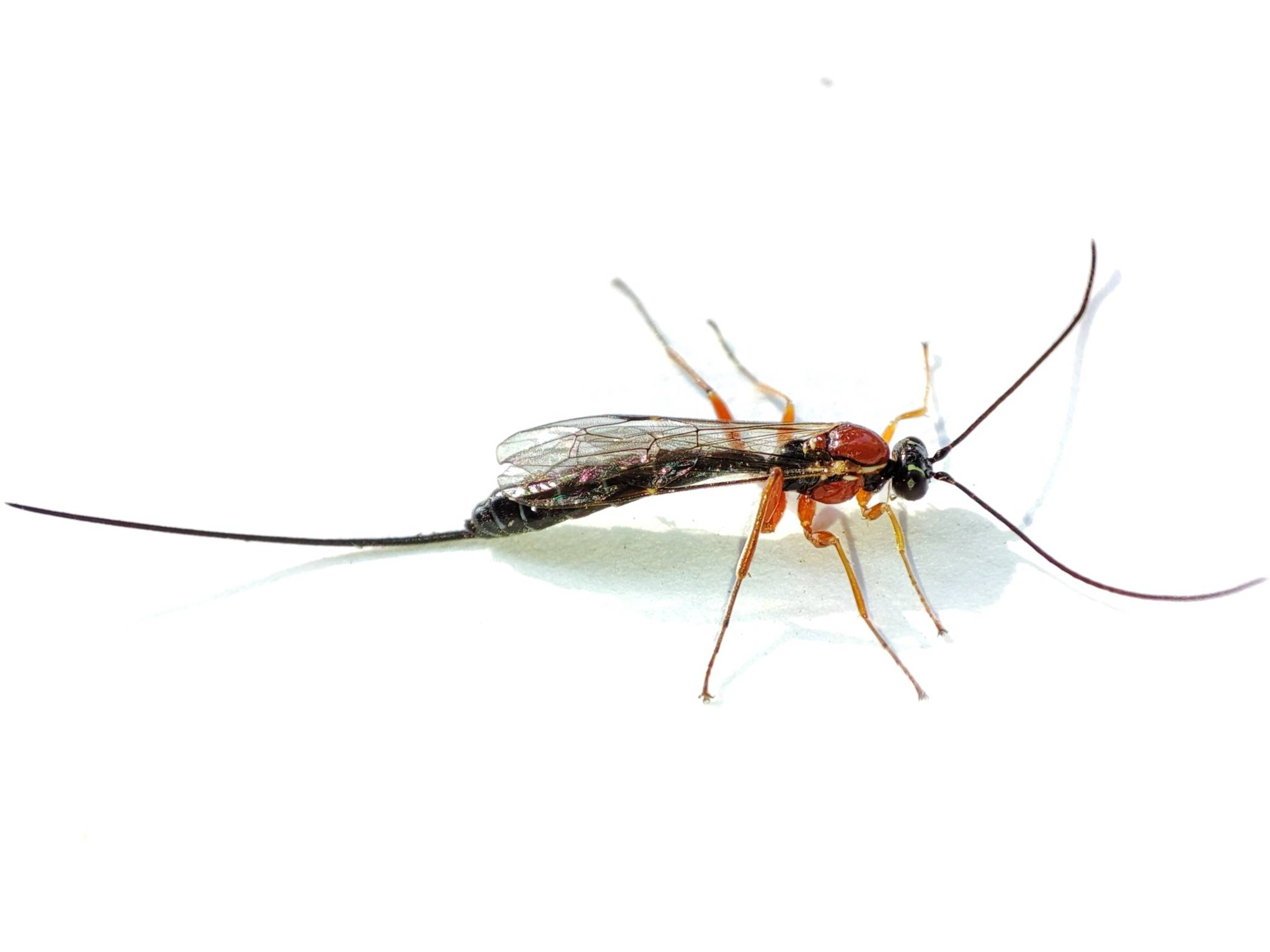
P. scurra scurra
