= Theodor P. von Brand =

American judge and heir of German noble family

Theodor P. von Brand (June 5, 1927 – November 15, 2004), (German notation Theodor Philipp Rudolf Freiherr von Brand zu Neidstein) was an American judge descending from a German noble family.

== Biography ==
Von Brand was born Erlangen as the son of the biochemist Theodor von Brand, who was dismissed from his position as a professor in 1933 due to his opposition to the ruling National Socialists. The family moved to the US in 1936. Von Brand joined the US Navy in 1944. After his return, his four-year studies at Brown University were financed by the Navy. Later, he served in the US Army in the occupation forces in post-war Germany. He completed his studies by earning his law degree in 1954 from George Washington University in Washington D.C.

Von Brand worked for almost fifteen years on antitrust cases at the Federal Trade Commission in Washington, D.C. During his legal career he also worked at the Social Security Administration, where he presided over black-lung disability cases brought by Appalachian coal miners. At the Interstate Commerce Commission, he ruled on the need for oversight of credit bureaus. Until his retirement, he served as an administrative law judge for the US Department of Labor where he presided over whistleblower cases concerning issues such as the rights of employees complaining of health risks in the workplace and the rights of California farmworkers to adequate working conditions.

=== Legal Career ===
Following his graduation from George Washington University Law School in 1954, Theodor P. von Brand began his career in the federal service of the United States. For nearly fifteen years, he worked at the Federal Trade Commission, where he dealt primarily with antitrust matters. He subsequently entered the federal administrative judiciary.

As an Administrative Law Judge (ALJ), von Brand served several federal agencies, including the Social Security Administration, the Interstate Commerce Commission, and the United States Department of Labor. His work encompassed social security, labor, and regulatory cases, many of which involved issues of considerable public importance.

==== Social Security and Regulatory Law ====
At the Social Security Administration, von Brand presided over claims brought by Appalachian coal miners suffering from black lung disease (coal workers' pneumoconiosis). These cases formed part of the federal compensation programs established to address occupational illnesses in the coal mining industry.

While serving at the Interstate Commerce Commission, he handled regulatory matters involving economic oversight. According to contemporary accounts, his work included decisions concerning governmental supervision of credit bureaus and the reliability of consumer credit information.

==== Labor and Whistleblower Law ====
The principal focus of von Brand's later judicial career was his service at the United States Department of Labor. There, he adjudicated cases involving workplace safety and the protection of whistleblowers. His docket included disputes concerning employees who reported health and safety hazards, as well as cases involving working conditions for agricultural laborers in California.

Several of his decisions are documented in the published case lists of the Department of Labor.

Among his earlier reported decisions was Hilton v. Glass-Tec Corp. (1984-STA-6), a proceeding under the Surface Transportation Assistance Act involving statutory protections for employees in the transportation sector. The case was subsequently reviewed by the Department of Labor and later reached the United States Court of Appeals for the Fourth Circuit.

In the field of nuclear-industry whistleblower protection, von Brand decided Billings v. Tennessee Valley Authority (1987-ERA-5). The case arose under the Energy Reorganization Act and was among the early federal cases concerning the protection of employees who raised nuclear safety concerns. The decision was subsequently reviewed by the Department of Labor and later became the subject of appellate proceedings before the United States Court of Appeals for the Sixth Circuit.

Additional documented decisions concerned environmental whistleblower protection. In Devine v. Buncombe County Department of Engineering Services (1987-SWD-1), von Brand issued a Recommended Decision and Order under the Solid Waste Disposal Act. He also presided over Jenkins v. Office of Solid Waste, EPA (1988-SWD-2), another matter arising under the federal environmental whistleblower provisions.

==== Workers' Compensation ====
In addition to his whistleblower docket, von Brand adjudicated cases under the Longshore and Harbor Workers' Compensation Act, a federal statute governing compensation for maritime, harbor, and shipyard workers. Several of his decisions were subsequently reviewed by the Benefits Review Board. Documented examples include Ferguson v. Southern States Cooperative (87-LHC-1762), Spriggs v. Newport News Shipbuilding (88-LHC-3504), and Dodd v. Newport News Shipbuilding (84-LHC-1289).

==== Selected Decisions ====
- Hilton v. Glass-Tec Corp., 1984-STA-6 (1984)
- Devine v. Buncombe County Department of Engineering Services, 1987-SWD-1 (1987)
- Billings v. Tennessee Valley Authority, 1987-ERA-5 (1989)
- Jenkins v. Office of Solid Waste, EPA, 1988-SWD-2 (1989)
- Ferguson v. Southern States Cooperative, 87-LHC-1762
- Spriggs v. Newport News Shipbuilding, 88-LHC-3504
- Dodd v. Newport News Shipbuilding, 84-LHC-1289

=== Heir of Schloss Neidstein ===
Von Brand was a descendant of the noble German Brand(t) family. In 1979, he inherited the castle Neidstein in the Upper Palatinate from his uncle Philipp Theodor Freiherr von Brand. Neidstein was the residence of the Brandt family since 1466. The castle became more widely known in 2006 when von Brand's heirs sold it to the American actor Nicolas Cage.
