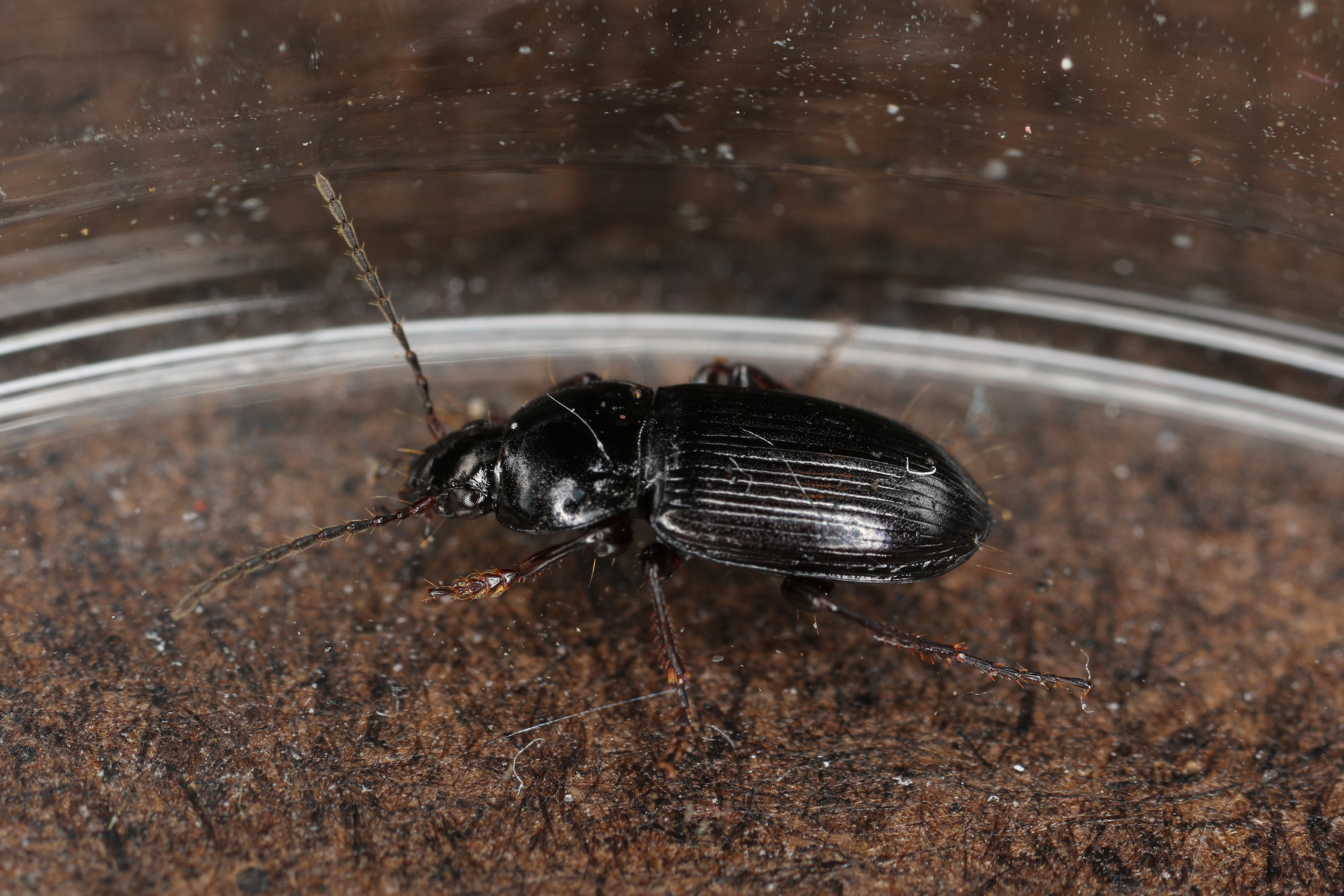

Scientific classification
- Kingdom: Animalia
- Phylum: Arthropoda
- Clade: Pancrustacea
- Class: Insecta
- Order: Coleoptera
- Suborder: Adephaga
- Family: Carabidae
- Genus: Pterostichus
- Species: P. vernalis

Binomial name
- Pterostichus vernalis Panzer, 1796

= Pterostichus vernalis =

Species of beetle

Pterostichus vernalis is a species of ground beetle native to Europe.

Their lengths usually span from 6 to 8 mm and its a black beetle with legs and antennae, dark brown to black. With a rounded pronotum, it also features toothed hind angles.

Geographically, this beetle mainly pertains to Britain, specifically in Leicestershire and Rutland.
