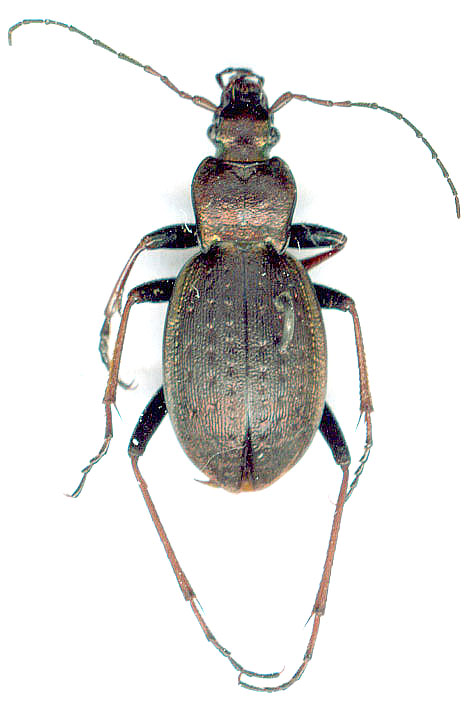

Scientific classification
- Domain: Eukaryota
- Kingdom: Animalia
- Phylum: Arthropoda
- Class: Insecta
- Order: Coleoptera
- Suborder: Adephaga
- Family: Carabidae
- Genus: Carabus
- Species: C. linnei

Binomial name
- Carabus linnei Panzer, 1810

Synonyms
- Carabus linnaei

= Carabus linnei =

Species of beetle

Carabus linnei is a species of ground beetle in the family Carabidae. It is found in Europe.

== Subspecies ==
These four subspecies belong to the species Carabus linnei:

- Carabus linnei folgariacus Bernau, 1913 (Austria and Italy)
- Carabus linnei hoverlaensis A.Müller & Panin, 2018 (Ukraine)
- Carabus linnei linnei Panzer, 1810 (Europe)
- Carabus linnei macaieri Dejean, 1826 (Romania)
