= Carabus sylvestris sylvestris =

Scientific classification
- Domain: Eukaryota
- Kingdom: Animalia
- Phylum: Arthropoda
- Class: Insecta
- Order: Coleoptera
- Suborder: Adephaga
- Family: Carabidae
- Genus: Carabus
- Species: C. sylvestris
- Subspecies: C. s. sylvestris

Trinomial name
- Carabus sylvestris sylvestris Panzer, 1793

Synonyms
- Orinocarabus sylvestris sylvestris; Carabus concolor Panzer, 1809 "Harz"; Carabus nivosus Heer, 1837 "High Alps of Switzerland"; Carabus nivalis Heer, 1841; Carabus aeneus Letzner, 1850; Carabus aeruginosus Letzner, 1850; Carabus brunneus Letzner, 1850; Carabus detritus Letzner, 1850; Carabus purpurascens Letzner, 1850; Carabus virescens Letzner, 1850; Carabus sylvinus Gistl, 1857 "Tirol"; Carabus thueringianus Schilsky, 1880 "Thuringen"; Carabus raxicola Reitter, 1896 "Raxalpe"; Carabus silesiacus Reitter, 1896 "Oberschlesien"; Carabus extroversus Lapouge, 1903; Carabus hortensoides Sokolar, 1910 "Stilfserjoch"; Carabus micklitzi Sokolar, 1910 "Alps of Nieder- & Oberösterreich"; Carabus blumenthalianus Mandl, 1963; Carabus slabai Niedl, 1968; Carabus guyicolasi Deuve & Simard, 1976

Subspecies of beetle

Carabus sylvestris sylvestris is a subspecies of brown-coloured beetle from family Carabidae, found in Austria, Czech Republic, France, Germany, Italy, Liechtenstein, Poland, and Switzerland.
