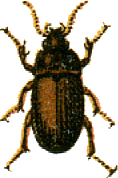

Scientific classification
- Kingdom: Animalia
- Phylum: Arthropoda
- Class: Insecta
- Order: Coleoptera
- Suborder: Adephaga
- Family: Carabidae
- Genus: Amara
- Species: A. lunicollis

Binomial name
- Amara lunicollis Schiødte, 1837

Synonyms
- Amara arsenjevi Lutshnik, 1935; Amara assimilis Chaudoir, 1844; Amara carriana Casey, 1924; Amara inepta LeConte, 1855; Amara limbata Schiødte, 1837; Amara marquettensis Casey, 1918; Amara poeciloides Heer, 1837; Amara zaisani Jedlička, 1964; Carabus vulgaris Linnaeus sensu Panzer, 1797

= Amara lunicollis =

Species of beetle

Amara lunicollis is a species of seed-eating ground beetle in the family Carabidae. It is found in Europe and Northern Asia (excluding China), North America, and temperate Asia.
