= Etzelwang =

- Municipality
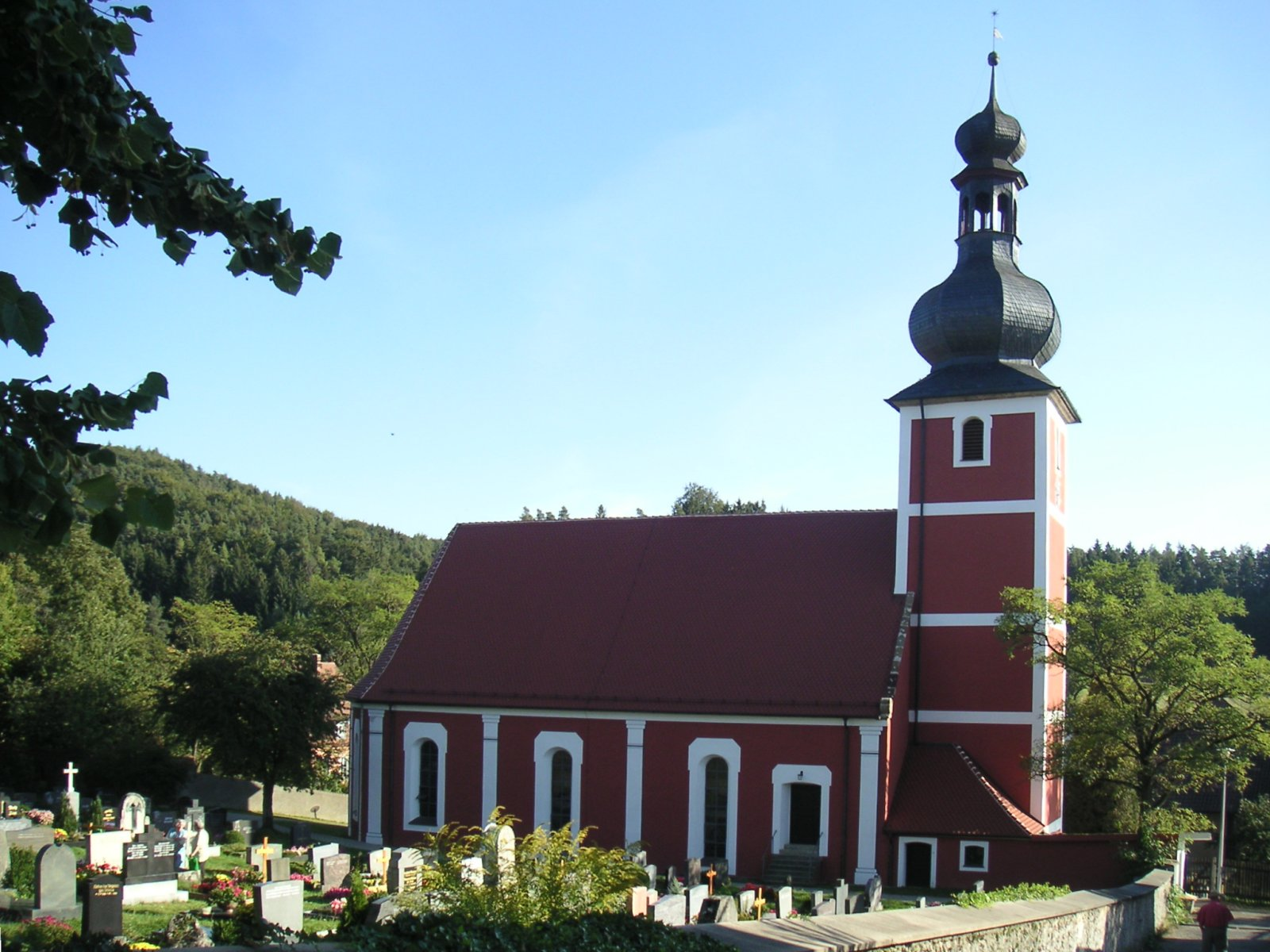
- Church of Saint Nicholas

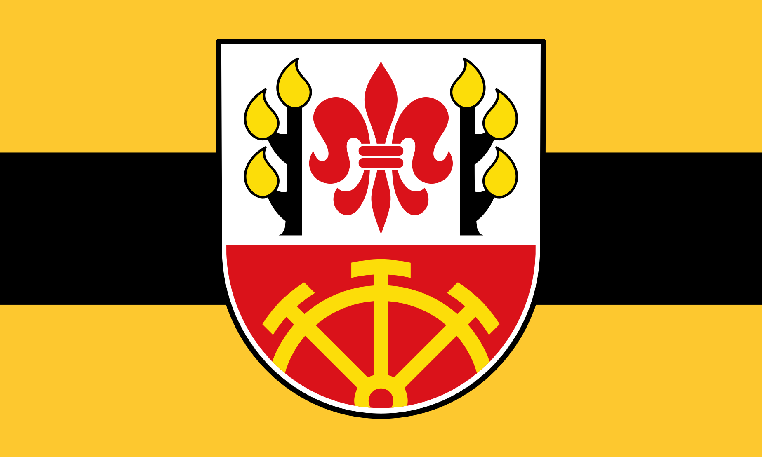
- Flag Coat of arms

- Location of Etzelwang within Amberg-Sulzbach district
- Interactive map of Etzelwang
- Location within Germany Location within Bavaria
- Coordinates: 49°32′N 11°35′E
- Country: Germany
- State: Bavaria
- Admin. region: Oberpfalz
- District: Amberg-Sulzbach
- Municipal assoc.: Neukirchen bei Sulzbach-Rosenberg

Government
  - Mayor (2020–26): Roman Berr (CSU)

Area
  - Total: 21.68 km^{2} (8.37 sq mi)
- Elevation: 390–596 m (1,280–1,955 ft)

Population (2025-12-31)
  - Total: 1,402
  - Density: 64.67/km^{2} (167.5/sq mi)
- Time zone: UTC+01:00 (CET)
  - Summer (DST): UTC+02:00 (CEST)
- Postal codes: 92268
- Dialling codes: 09663
- Vehicle registration: AS
- Website: www.etzelwang.de

Etzelwang (German pronunciation: [ˈɛtsl̩vaŋ]) is a municipality in the district of Amberg-Sulzbach in Bavaria in Germany.

== Geography ==
Apart from Etzelwang the municipality consists of the following villages:

- Albersdorf
- Gerhardsberg
- Hauseck
- Kirchenreinbach
- Lehendorf
- Lehenhammer
- Neidstein
- Neutras
- Penzenhof
- Rupprechtstein
- Schmidtstadt
- Tabernackel
- Ziegelhütten

== History ==
Etzelwang has existed as a parish since the second half of the 11th century. However, the present municipality of Etzelwang was not created until the Bavarian administrative reforms of 1972 to 1975. It was created from the political units of Neidstein, Kirchenreinbach, and Schmidtstadt.

=== Name ===
Etzel comes from the same root as Heinrich or English Henry. It is not certain which Heinrich gave his name to the parish and subsequently to the municipality. It is possible that it refers to Holy Roman Emperor Heinrich II, who founded the bishopric of Bamberg, to which the parish belonged.

== Sights ==
Places of interest in Etzelwang include the following:

- Schloss Neidstein, a castle once owned by actor Nicolas Cage.
- St. Nikolaus church

The church was originally dedicated in 1059, but subsequently destroyed. The present church was built from 1721 to the completion of the tower in 1763.

- Ruins of Burg Hauseck
- Neutras cliffs
- Burg Rupprechtstein
- Hofmark of Kirchenreinbach
- Church of St. Ulrich in Kirchereinbach

== Notable people ==
- Georg Wolfgang Franz Panzer (31 May 1755 in Etzelwang – 28 June 1829) botanist and entomologist
- Walter Künneth (1 January 1901 in Etzelwang – 26 October 1997) Protestant theologian
