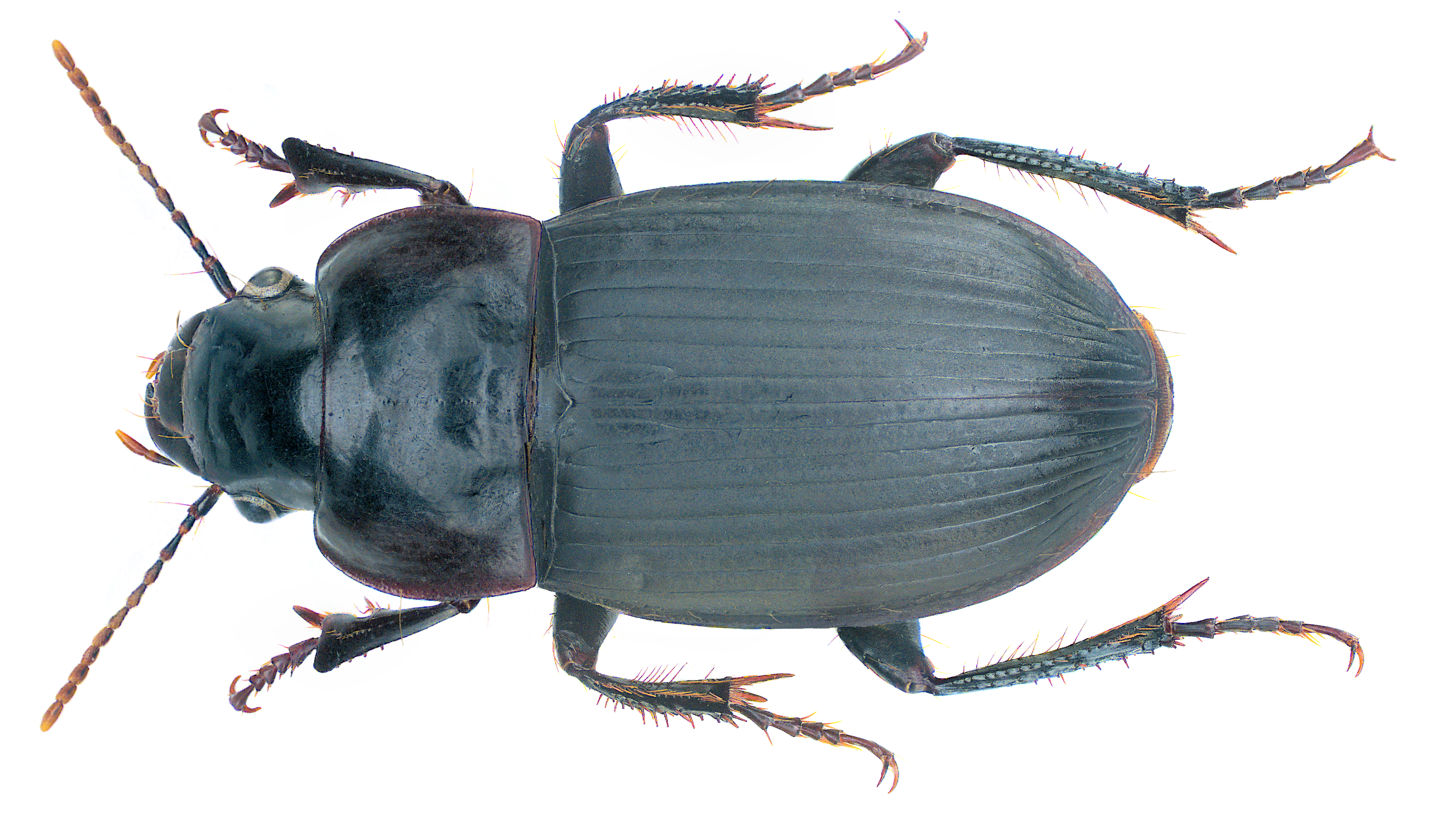
- Family: Carabidae Size: 13.5 mm (13.0 to 15.0 mm) Distribution: West Europe to Siberia Ecology: Loves dry areas with sandy soils Location: Russia, Volgograd, Kamyshensky, Golubaja river valley, 150 m leg. E.Alexeer, 15.-19.IV.2000; det. Wrase, 2016

Scientific classification
- Kingdom: Animalia
- Phylum: Arthropoda
- Clade: Pancrustacea
- Class: Insecta
- Order: Coleoptera
- Suborder: Adephaga
- Family: Carabidae
- Genus: Harpalus
- Species: H. hirtipes

Binomial name
- Harpalus hirtipes (Panzer, 1796)

= Harpalus hirtipes =

Species of beetle

Harpalus hirtipes is a species of ground beetle native to Europe, where it can be found in such countries as Austria, Baltic states, Belarus, Belgium, Bulgaria, Czech Republic, Denmark, France, Germany, Hungary, Italy, Moldova, Poland, Romania, Slovakia, Slovenia, Sweden, Switzerland, Ukraine, and eastern and central parts of Russia. Its wearabouts in Italy and Switzerland is doubtful. It is also found in such Asian countries as Mongolia, Kazakhstan, Kyrgyzstan, and Chinese province of Xinjiang.
