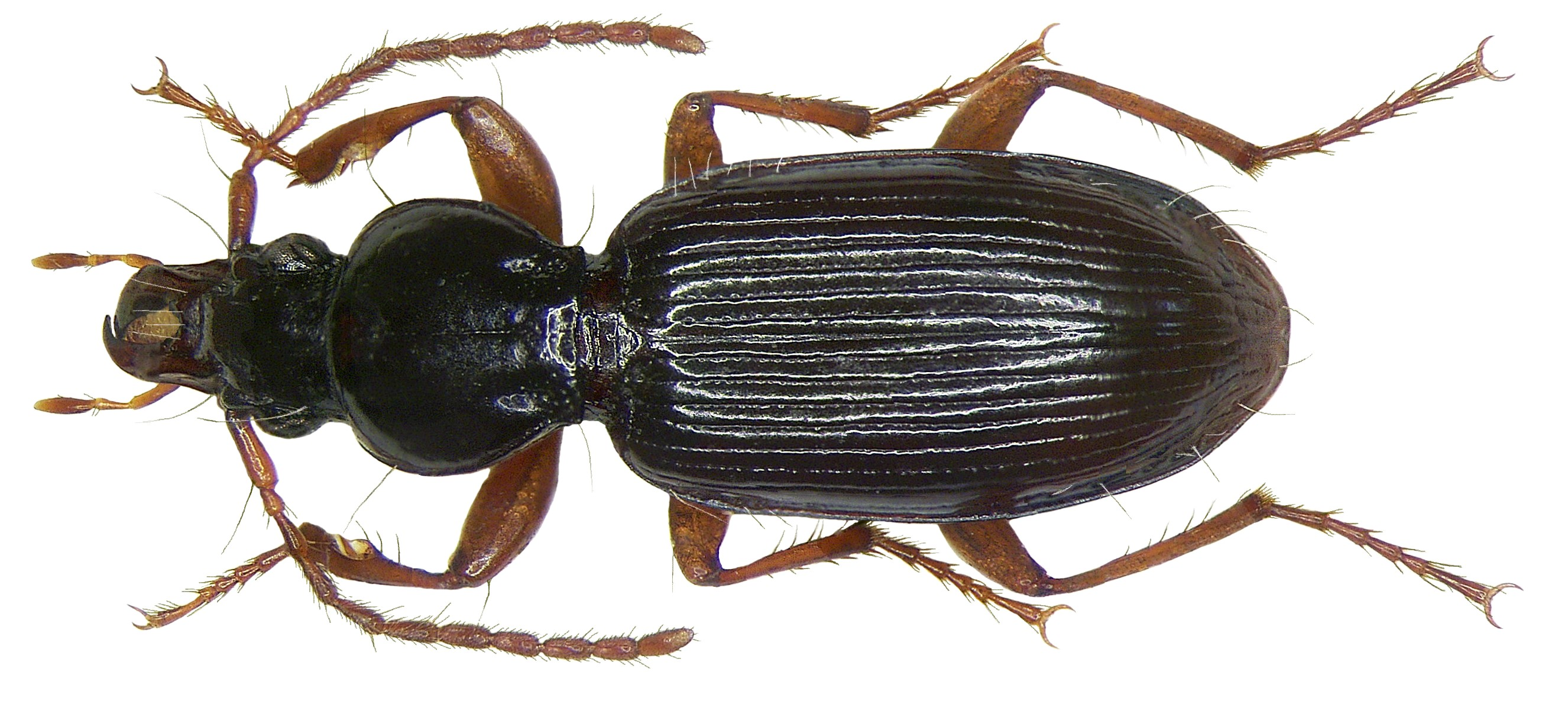

Scientific classification
- Kingdom: Animalia
- Phylum: Arthropoda
- Clade: Pancrustacea
- Class: Insecta
- Order: Coleoptera
- Suborder: Adephaga
- Family: Carabidae
- Genus: Stomis
- Species: S. pumicatus

Binomial name
- Stomis pumicatus (Panzer, 1795)

= Stomis pumicatus =

Species of beetle

Stomis pumicatus is a species of ground beetle native to Europe.
