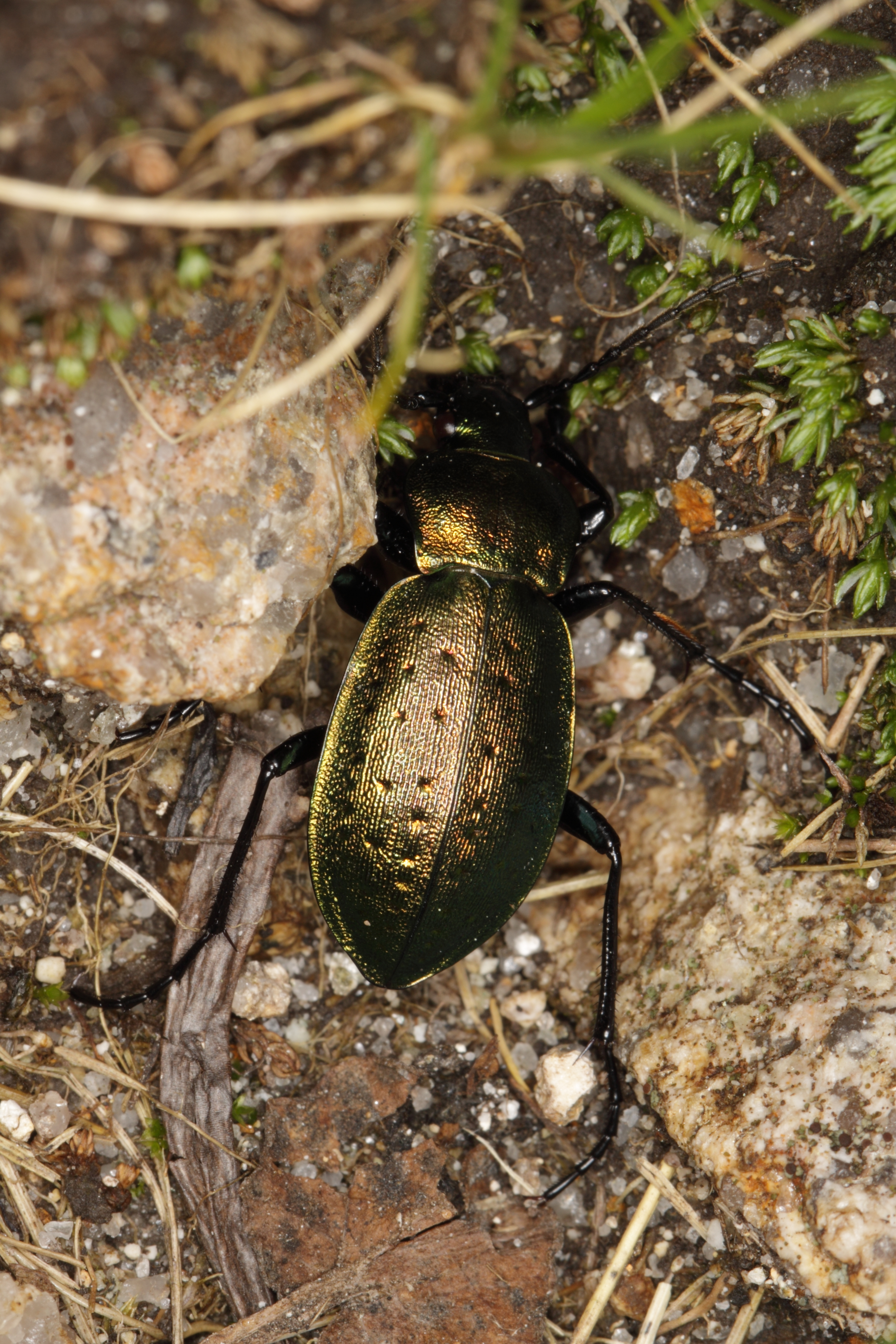
- Carabus sylvestris

Scientific classification
- Kingdom: Animalia
- Phylum: Arthropoda
- Class: Insecta
- Order: Coleoptera
- Suborder: Adephaga
- Family: Carabidae
- Genus: Carabus
- Species: C. sylvestris
- Subspecies: C. s. transsylvanicus

Trinomial name
- Carabus sylvestris transsylvanicus Dejean, 1826

Synonyms
- Carabus sylvestris transylvanicus Dejean, 1826; Orinocarabus sylvestris transylvanicus

= Carabus sylvestris transsylvanicus =

Subspecies of beetle

Carabus sylvestris transsylvanicus is a subspecies of green-coloured beetle in the family Carabidae that can be found in Hungary, Liechtenstein, Poland, Romania, and Slovakia.
