= Weinland =

Weinland may refer to:

== Places ==
- Târnăveni, a city in Mureș County, central Romania
- Zürcher Weinland, Andelfingen District, Switzerland

== People ==
- David Friedrich Weinland (1829–1915), German zoologist and writer
- Dietlind Weinland, German jurist
- Ernst Weinland (1869–1932), German physiologist and parasitologist
- John Weinland Killinger (1824–1896), Republican member of the U.S. House of Representatives
- Manfred Weinland (born 1960), German author

== Other uses ==
- Weinland (band), an independent band from Portland, Oregon, United States

== See also ==
- Vinland, an area of coastal North America explored by Norse Vikings
- Weinland Park, a neighborhood in Columbus, Ohio
- Wineland (disambiguation)
