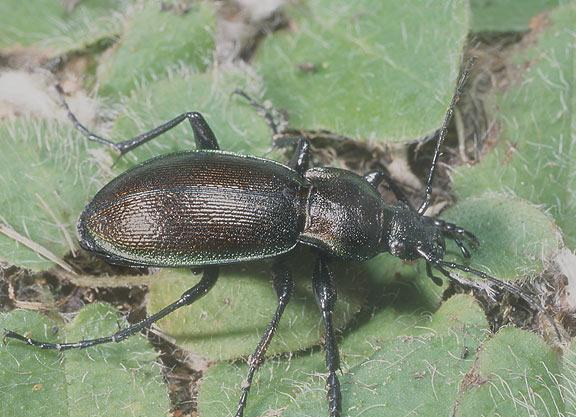

Scientific classification
- Kingdom: Animalia
- Phylum: Arthropoda
- Clade: Pancrustacea
- Class: Insecta
- Order: Coleoptera
- Suborder: Adephaga
- Family: Carabidae
- Genus: Carabus
- Species: C. scheidleri

Binomial name
- Carabus scheidleri Panzer, 1799

= Carabus scheidleri =

Species of beetle

Carabus scheidleri is a species of beetle. It is endemic to Europe, where it is found in Austria, the Czech Republic, Germany, Hungary, Liechtenstein, Poland, Slovakia.
