= Christian Daniel Zenker =

German entomologist

Christian Daniel Zenker (1766–1819) was a German entomologist who specialised in Coleoptera. He contributed species descriptions to Georg Wolfgang Franz Panzer's Faunae insectorum germanicae initia (Elements of the insect fauna of Germany). He was Hofmarschall for the Kingdom of Saxony. His collection is held by the Staatliches Museum für Tierkunde, Dresden.
