= Schloss Neidstein =

Castle in Germany

Coordinates: 49°32′03″N 11°36′17″E

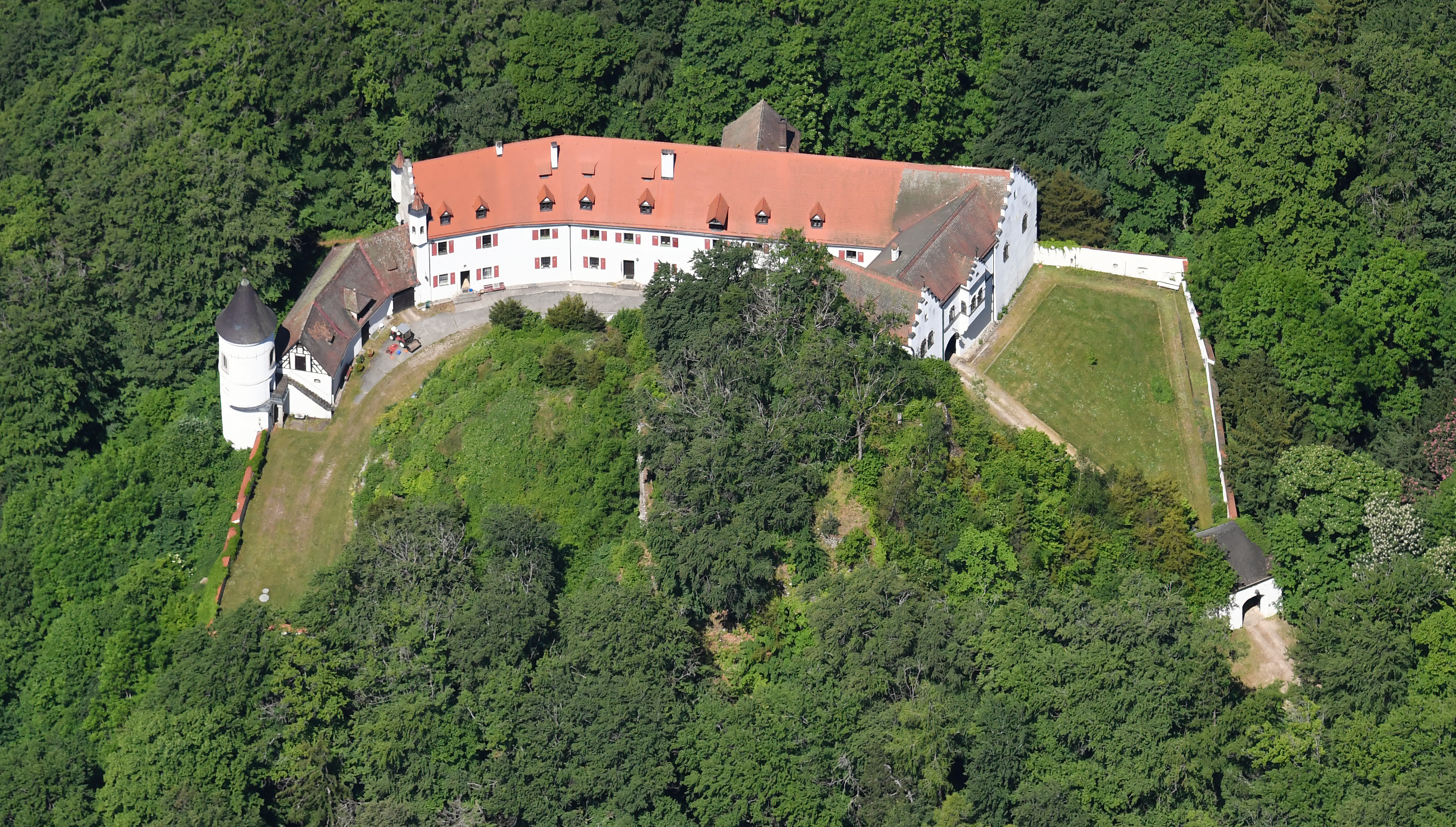
Schloss Neidstein

Schloss Neidstein is a castle located in the Upper Palatinate in Bavaria, Germany, in the municipality of Etzelwang.

It was the seat of a Hofmark (a lower legal entity) during the Palatinate-Sulzbach period (16th–18th centuries). The castle, with its 165 hectares of forest and meadows, is now part of the Schergenbuck reserve. Neidstein was the residence of the Brandt family since 1466. In 1979, the castle was inherited by the American administrative law judge Theodor P. Von Brand from his uncle Philipp Theodor Freiherr von Brand. After his death in 2004, the von Brand heirs sold the castle in 2006 to the actor Nicolas Cage. In 2009, Cage sold the castle to a lawyer in Amberg. The castle was modernised and is now used as a venue for workshops and conferences by the Fraunhofer Society.

== Building ==
The ruins of the original Schloss Neidstein are located on top of the peak above the New Castle. The New Castle, an elongated tract with the east gate and a round tower in the west, was designed by Jobst Brand(t) and completed in 1513.

Today's appearance, especially that of the gables, is due to a renovation between 1855 and 1860. Several wall reliefs that show themes from the Old Testament were carved by Georg Schweiger (17th century) from Amberg.

== Library and archives ==
The castle's extensive archives date back to the 16th century, and have been available at the state archives in Amberg since 2006. A substantial part of the area housing the archives was supposedly used to accommodate horses of French troops passing through in 1796.

The whereabouts of the castle's library were unknown until an article in the Frankfurter Allgemeine Zeitung (28 October 2006, p. 48) announced that a large amount of literature would be auctioned in Munich in November 2006.
