= Carabus sylvestris redtenbacheri =

Scientific classification
- Domain: Eukaryota
- Kingdom: Animalia
- Phylum: Arthropoda
- Class: Insecta
- Order: Coleoptera
- Suborder: Adephaga
- Family: Carabidae
- Genus: Carabus
- Species: C. sylvestris
- Subspecies: C. s. redtenbacheri

Trinomial name
- Carabus sylvestris redtenbacheri Gehin, 1876

Subspecies of beetle

Carabus sylvestris redtenbacheri is a subspecies of beetle in the family Carabidae that is endemic to Austria.
