= Stomis termitiformis =

Scientific classification
- Domain: Eukaryota
- Kingdom: Animalia
- Phylum: Arthropoda
- Class: Insecta
- Order: Coleoptera
- Suborder: Adephaga
- Family: Carabidae
- Genus: Stomis
- Species: S. termitiformis

Binomial name
- Stomis termitiformis (Van Dyke, 1926)

Synonyms
- Pterostichus termitiformis Van Dyke, 1926

Species of beetle

Stomis termitiformis is a species of woodland ground beetle in the family Carabidae. It is found in North America.
