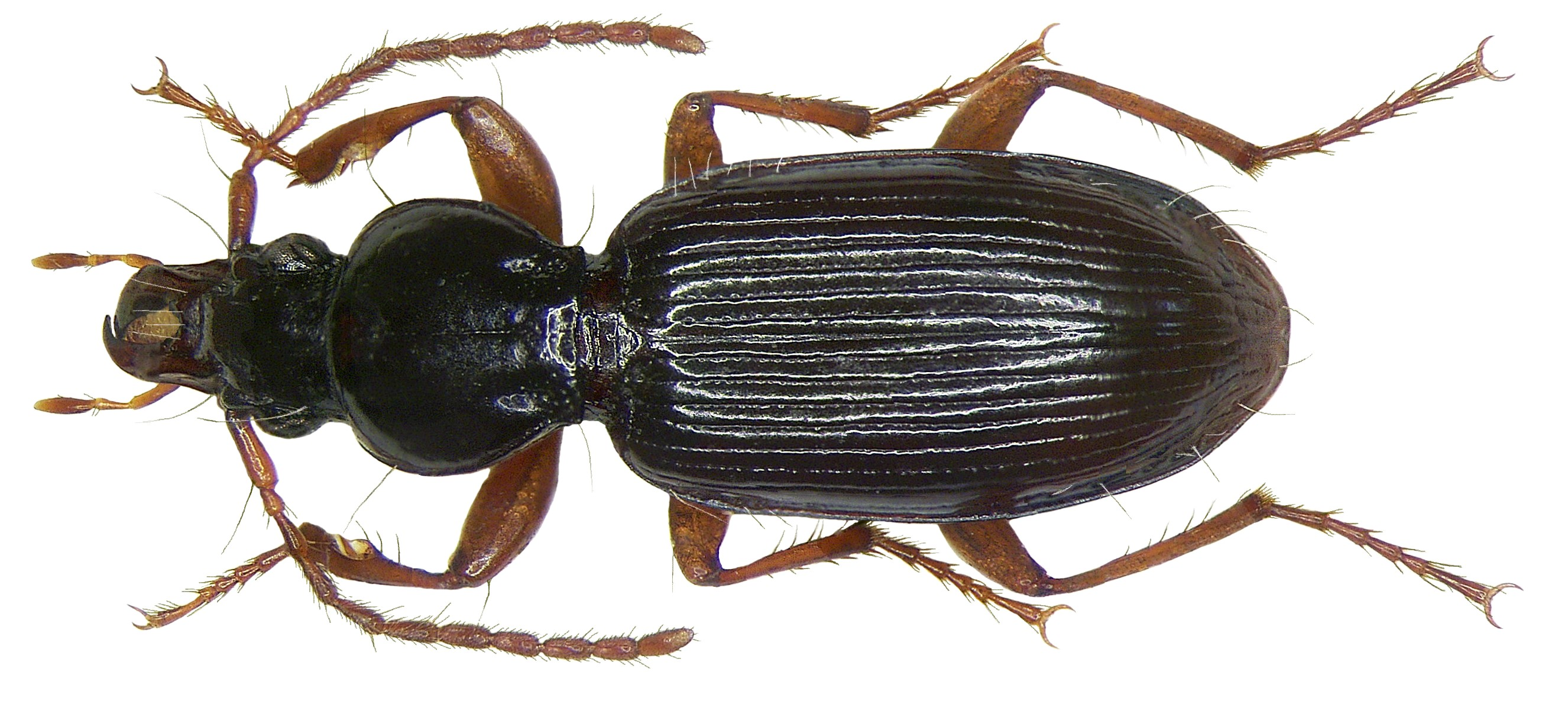
- Stomis pumicatus

Scientific classification
- Domain: Eukaryota
- Kingdom: Animalia
- Phylum: Arthropoda
- Class: Insecta
- Order: Coleoptera
- Suborder: Adephaga
- Family: Carabidae
- Subfamily: Pterostichinae
- Tribe: Pterostichini
- Genus: Stomis; Clairville, 1806

Subgenera
- Neostomis Bousquet, 1983; Stomis Clairville, 1806

= Stomis =

Genus of beetles

Stomis is a genus of woodland ground beetles in the family Carabidae. There are more than 40 described species in Stomis.

== Species ==
These 42 species belong to the genus Stomis:

- Stomis benesi Dvorak, 2006
- Stomis benoiti Jeannel, 1953
- Stomis brivioi Sciaky, 1998
- Stomis bucciarellii Pesarini, 1979
- Stomis cavazzutii Lassalle, 2003
- Stomis chinensis Jedlicka, 1932
- Stomis collucens (Fairmaire, 1889)
- Stomis danielanus Semenov, 1904
- Stomis deuvei Marcilhac, 1993
- Stomis eggeri Monzini, 2016
- Stomis elegans Oustalet, 1874
- Stomis elongatus Tian & Pan, 2004
- Stomis exilis Sciaky & Wrase, 1997
- Stomis facchinii Sciaky, 1998
- Stomis fallettii Facchini, 2003
- Stomis farkaci Sciaky, 1998
- Stomis formosus Semenov, 1889
- Stomis gigas Sciaky, 1998
- Stomis granulatus Say, 1830
- Stomis habashanensis Lassalle, 2007
- Stomis hyrcanus Tschitscherine, 1904
- Stomis jelineki Lassalle, 2003
- Stomis ludmilae Dvorak, 2001
- Stomis miyakei Morita, 2010
- Stomis ovipennis Chaudoir, 1846
- Stomis philospelaeus Monzini, 2018
- Stomis politus Ledoux & Roux, 1995
- Stomis prognathus Bates, 1883
- Stomis pumicatus (Panzer, 1795)
- Stomis robustus Sciaky, 1998
- Stomis roccai Schatzmayr, 1925
- Stomis romani Dvorak, 2001
- Stomis rostratus (Duftschmid, 1812)
- Stomis schoenmanni Sciaky, 1998
- Stomis sehnali Lassalle, 2007
- Stomis stefanii Deuve, 2006
- Stomis taibashanensis Lassalle, 2003
- Stomis termitiformis (Van Dyke, 1926)
- Stomis titanus Sciaky, 1998
- Stomis tschitscherini Semenov, 1904
- Stomis vignai Sciaky, 1998
- Stomis zaonus Habu, 1954
