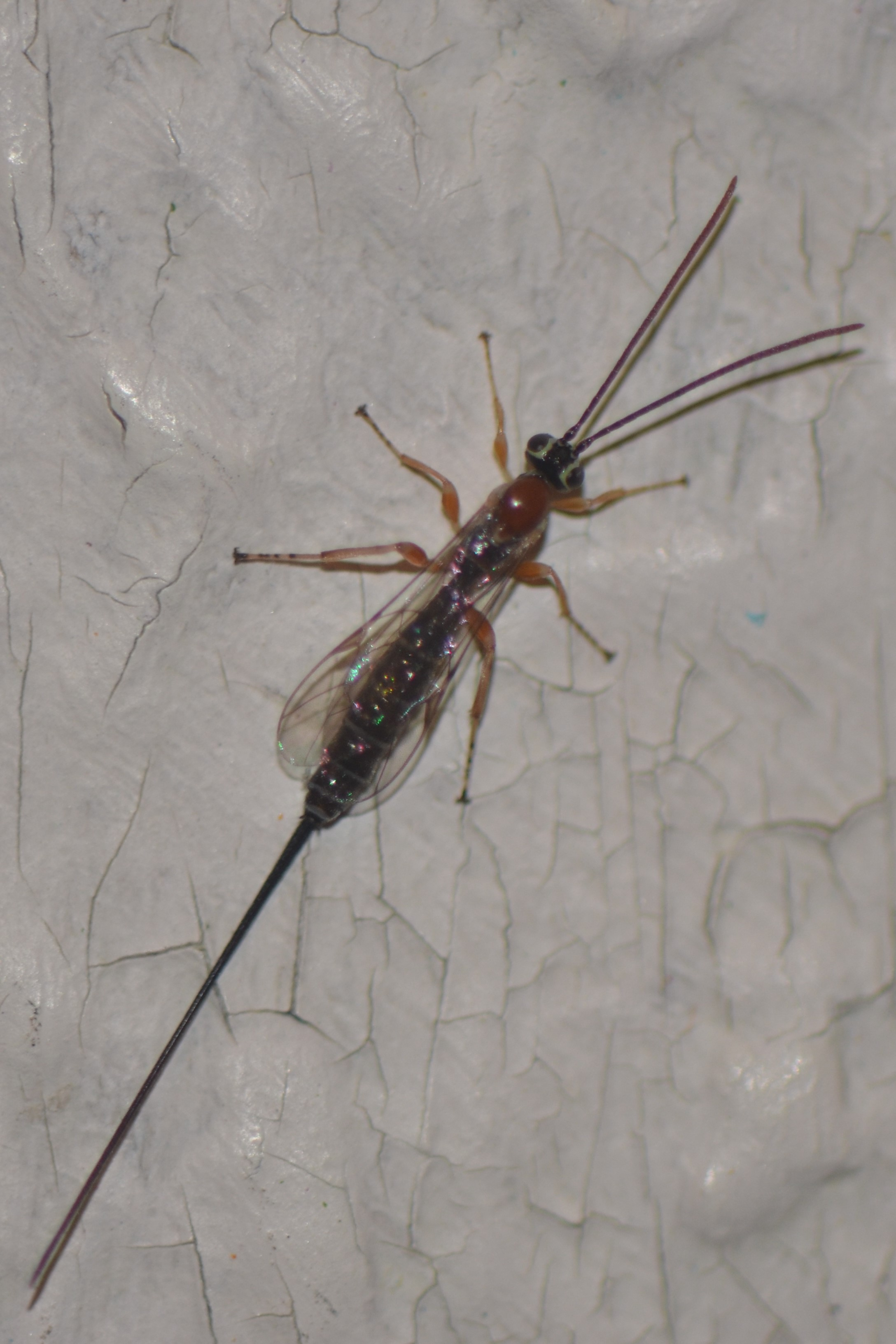
- Perithous septemcinctorius

Scientific classification
- Domain: Eukaryota
- Kingdom: Animalia
- Phylum: Arthropoda
- Class: Insecta
- Order: Hymenoptera
- Family: Ichneumonidae
- Tribe: Delomeristini
- Genus: Perithous; Holmgren, 1859

= Perithous (wasp) =

Genus of insects

Perithous is a genus of parasitoid wasps belonging to the family Ichneumonidae.

The species of this genus are found in Europe and North America.

== Species ==
The following species are recognised in the genus Perithous:

- Perithous albicinctus (Gravenhorst, 1829)
- Perithous changbaishanus (He, 1996)
- Perithous digitalis Gupta, 1982
- Perithous divinator (Rossi, 1790)
- Perithous galbus Baltazar, 1961
- Perithous guizhouensis He, 1996
- Perithous kamathi Gupta, 1982
- Perithous nigrigaster Constantineanu & Constantineanu, 1968
- Perithous romanicus Constantineanu & Constantineanu, 1968
- Perithous rufimesothorax (He, 1996)
- Perithous scurra (Panzer, 1804)
- Perithous septemcinctorius (Thunberg, 1822)
- Perithous speculator Haupt, 1954
- Perithous sundaicus Gupta, 1982
- Perithous townesorum (Gupta, 1982)
- Perithous transversus Constantineanu & Constantineanu, 1968
- Perithous virgulatus Baltazar, 1961
