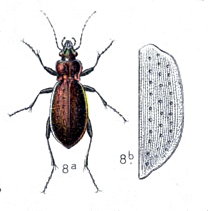

Scientific classification
- Kingdom: Animalia
- Phylum: Arthropoda
- Clade: Pancrustacea
- Class: Insecta
- Order: Coleoptera
- Suborder: Adephaga
- Family: Carabidae
- Genus: Carabus
- Species: C. sylvestris

Binomial name
- Carabus sylvestris Panzer, 1793

Synonyms
- Carabus nivosus Heer, 1837; Orinocarabus sylvestris

= Carabus sylvestris =

Species of beetle

Carabus sylvestris is a species of either black or brown-coloured ground beetle in the Carabinae subfamily that can be found in Austria, Czech Republic, Hungary, Italy, Liechtenstein, Poland, Romania, Slovakia, Slovenia, Ukraine, and the Netherlands.

Subspecies include:

- Carabus sylvestris haberfelneri
- Carabus sylvestris kolbi
- Carabus sylvestris redtenbacheri
- Carabus sylvestris sylvestris
