= Wineland =

Wineland may refer to:

- Vinland, an area of coastal North America explored by Norse Vikings
- Boland, Western Cape, South Africa, referred to as the Cape Winelands
- David J. Wineland (born 1944), American physicist
- Eddie Wineland (born 1984), American mixed martial artist
- Claire Wineland (1997–2018), American activist, writer, and entrepreneur
- Wineland blue, a butterfly of family Lycaenidae

== See also ==
- Weinland (disambiguation)
