= Carabus sylvestris haberfelneri =

Scientific classification
- Domain: Eukaryota
- Kingdom: Animalia
- Phylum: Arthropoda
- Class: Insecta
- Order: Coleoptera
- Suborder: Adephaga
- Family: Carabidae
- Genus: Carabus
- Species: C. sylvestris
- Subspecies: C. s. haberfelneri

Trinomial name
- Carabus sylvestris haberfelneri Ganglbauer, 1891

Subspecies of beetle

Carabus sylvestris haberfelneri is a subspecies of beetle in the family Carabidae that can be found in Austria and Germany.
