= Ernst Weinland =

German physiologist and parasitologist

Ernst Weinland (9 March 1869, Hohenwittlingen – 17 October 1932, Urach) was a German physiologist and parasitologist.

He studied medicine at the Ludwig-Maximilians-Universität München, the University of Tübingen, the Friedrich Wilhelm University of Berlin, and Leipzig University. He also studied zoology, and in the process earned a PhD at the Friedrich Wilhelm University of Berlin. After finishing his medical studies at Leipzig University, he worked as an assistant physician in Esslingen am Neckar and as an assistant in the laboratory of Karl von Voit at the Ludwig-Maximilians-Universität München. In 1899, he obtained his habilitation for physiology and afterwards became an associate professor at the technical school in Freising. From 1913 to 1932, he was a professor of physiology at the University of Erlangen.

He is known for his pioneer research involving the metabolism of parasitic nematodes (Ascaris). He also published papers on the metabolism of the fly genus Calliphora.

== Selected writings ==
- Beiträge zur Kenntnis des Baues des Dipteren-Schwingers, 1890.
- Ueber die Bildung von Glykogen nach Galactosefütterung (Z. Biol., 1900, 40, 374— 385) – Formation of glycogen after feeding on galactose.
- Ueber die Lactase des Pankreas. Zweite Mittheilung zur Frage nach den Ursachen, welche die Bildung der Lactase hervorrufen, Ibid., 1900, n. F., xxii, 386-391 – On lactase of the pancreas.
- Ueber den Glykogengchalt einiger parasitischer Würmer, (Z. Biol. Bd. XLI. 1901. Heft 1. p. 69—74).
- Ueber ausgepresste Extrakte von Ascaris lumbricoides und ihre Wirkung. (Z. Biol., 48, 86. — 1902).
