= Nicolas Cage =

American actor (born 1964)

- Cage in 2026
- Born: Nicolas Kim Coppola; January 7, 1964 (age 62); Long Beach, California, U.S.
- Occupations: Actor; film producer
- Years active: 1981–present
- Works: Full list
- Spouses: Patricia Arquette (m. 1995; div. 2001); Lisa Marie Presley (m. 2002; div. 2004); Alice Kim (m. 2004; div. 2016); Erika Koike (m. 2019; ann. 2019); Riko Shibata (m. 2021)
- Children: 3
- Father: August Coppola
- Family: Coppola family
- Awards: Full list

Nicolas Cage (born Nicolas Kim Coppola; January 7, 1964) is an American actor and film producer known for his versatility as an actor across diverse film genres, which has gained him a significant cult following. The recipient of various accolades, he was inducted into the Hollywood Walk of Fame in 1998. Cage was also voted one of the 50 greatest actors of all time in a 2022 readers' poll by Empire magazine.

Born into the Coppola family, Cage began his career in films such as Valley Girl (1983) and Birdy (1984), as well as the films by his uncle Francis Ford Coppola, Rumble Fish (1983), The Cotton Club (1984), and Peggy Sue Got Married (1986). He earned enthusiastic notices for his expressionistic performances in films such as Moonstruck, Raising Arizona (both 1987), Vampire's Kiss (1988), and Wild at Heart (1990), culminating in him earning an Academy Award for Best Actor for Leaving Las Vegas (1995). He was Oscar-nominated for playing twins Charlie and Donald Kaufman in the comedy-drama film Adaptation (2002).

After his Oscar win, Cage established himself as a mainstream action star, in films such as The Rock (1996), Con Air (1997), Face/Off (1997), Gone in 60 Seconds (2000), the National Treasure film series (2004–2007), the Ghost Rider film series (2007–2011), and Kick-Ass (2010). He also continued to portray dramatic roles in City of Angels (1998), Bringing Out the Dead (1999), The Family Man (2000), Matchstick Men (2003), Lord of War (2005), Bad Lieutenant: Port of Call New Orleans (2008), and Joe (2013), and played Spider-Man Noir in Spider-Man: Into the Spider-Verse (2018), Spider-Noir (2026), and Spider-Man: Beyond the Spider-Verse (2027). After starring in a variety of straight-to-video on demand productions, he earned renewed critical recognition for his starring roles in Mandy (2018), Pig (2021), The Unbearable Weight of Massive Talent (2022), Dream Scenario (2023) and Longlegs (2024).

Cage owns the production company Saturn Films and has produced films such as Shadow of the Vampire (2000) and The Life of David Gale (2003), and has directed Sonny (2002).

== Early life and family ==
Nicolas Cage was born Nicolas Kim Coppola on January 7, 1964 in Long Beach, California, to August Coppola, a professor of literature, and Joy Vogelsang, a dancer and choreographer. He was raised in a Catholic family. His father was of Italian descent and his mother was of mainly German and Polish descent with some English and Scottish ancestry on her father's side. His paternal grandparents were composer Carmine Coppola and actress Italia Pennino, and his paternal great-grandparents were immigrants from Bernalda, Basilicata. Through his father, he is a nephew of both director Francis Ford Coppola and actress Talia Shire, and a cousin of directors Roman Coppola and Sofia Coppola, film producer Gian-Carlo Coppola, and actors Robert and Jason Schwartzman.

Cage is the youngest of three sons. His two brothers are New York radio personality Marc "The Cope" Coppola and director Christopher Coppola. He attended Beverly Hills High School, which is known for its many alumni who became entertainers. He aspired to act from an early age and also attended UCLA School of Theater, Film and Television. His first non-cinematic acting experience was in a school production of Golden Boy. He said he started acting because he "wanted to be James Dean. I saw him in Rebel Without a Cause, East of Eden. Nothing affected me—no rock song, no classical music—the way Dean affected me in Eden. It blew my mind. I was like, 'That's what I want to do'."

At age 15, he tried to convince his uncle, Francis Ford Coppola, to give him a screen test, telling him "I'll show you acting". His outburst was met with "silence in the car". By this stage of his career, Coppola had already directed Marlon Brando, Al Pacino, Gene Hackman and Robert De Niro. Although early in his career Cage appeared in some of his uncle's films, he changed his name to Nicolas Cage to avoid the appearance of nepotism as Coppola's nephew. Despite using this stage name his entire professional life, he only legally changed it in 2025. His choice of name was inspired by the Marvel Comics superhero Luke Cage and composer John Cage.

== Career ==
=== 1981–1988: Early work and breakthrough ===
Cage made his acting debut in the 1981 television pilot The Best of Times, which was never picked up by ABC. His film debut followed in 1982, with a minor role as an unnamed co-worker of Judge Reinhold's character in the coming-of-age film Fast Times at Ridgemont High, having originally auditioned for Reinhold's part. His experience on the film was marred by cast members endlessly quoting his uncle's films, which inspired him to change his name. Cage's first starring role came opposite Deborah Foreman in the romantic comedy Valley Girl (1983), in which he played a punk who falls in love with the titular valley girl, a plot loosely inspired by Romeo and Juliet. The film was a modest box office success and has been branded a cult classic. He auditioned for the role of Dallas Winston in his uncle's film The Outsiders, based on S.E. Hinton's novel, but lost to Matt Dillon. Cage, however, would co-star in Coppola's adaptation of another Hinton novel, Rumble Fish, in that year.

In 1984, Cage appeared in three period films, none of which fared well at the box office. In the drama, Racing with the Moon (1984), Cage featured opposite Sean Penn as friends who are awaiting deployment to the United States Marine Corps. In Coppola's crime drama The Cotton Club he portrayed a fictionalized version of mob hitman Vincent "Mad Dog" Coll, earning praise from critic Paul Attanasio for "artfully [using] his few moments to sketch a brawny, violent thug." His final release of the year was Alan Parker's drama Birdy, in which he starred with Matthew Modine. Cage lost weight for the role and had two of his front teeth pulled out to appear disfigured. Despite massively underperforming at the box office, the film, and Cage and Modine's performances, received positive reviews, with The New York Times critic Janet Maslin writing, "Mr. Cage very sympathetically captures Al's urgency and frustration. Together, these actors work miracles with what might have been unplayable."

In 1986, Cage starred in the little-seen Canadian sports drama The Boy in Blue and his uncle's fantasy comedy Peggy Sue Got Married as the husband to Kathleen Turner's character. He then starred in the Coen brothers' crime comedy Raising Arizona (1987) as a dim-witted ex-con. Cage's biggest breakthrough came in 1987 with the romantic comedy Moonstruck, in which he starred alongside Cher as a hot-tempered baker. The film was a hit with critics and audiences alike, earning Cage a Golden Globe nomination for Best Actor – Motion Picture Musical or Comedy In his retrospective review, Roger Ebert wrote that he felt Cage's performance was worthy of an Oscar.

=== 1989–1994: Shift to "Everyman Roles" ===
In 1989, Cage starred in the black comedy Vampire's Kiss as a man who falls in love with a vampire and soon begins to believe himself as a vampire. The film was a major box office flop but has developed a cult following largely due to Cage's surrealistic and over-the-top performance appearing in internet memes. Critic Vincent Canby felt the film was "dominated and destroyed by Mr. Cage's chaotic, self-indulgent performance." After filming the Italian drama Time to Kill (1989) in Zimbabwe, he starred in David Lynch's romantic crime film Wild at Heart (1990) with Laura Dern. Cage was drawn to the project because he was "always attracted to those passionate, almost unbridled romantic characters" and it allowed him to impersonate one of his heroes, Elvis Presley, in scenes in which he sang. Wild at Heart received mixed reviews upon release, despite controversially winning the Palme d'Or at the 1990 Cannes Film Festival. Cage would reunite with Lynch and Dern for the avant-garde concert performance Industrial Symphony No. 1.

Also in 1990, he starred as a helicopter pilot in the action film Fire Birds, which was panned by critics and negatively compared to Top Gun (1986). Cage's next film, the erotic thriller Zandalee (1991), was released direct-to-video in the United States, where it did not receive a theatrical release. His "goofy 'everyman'" performance in the romantic comedy Honeymoon in Vegas (1992) garnered some positive critical notices, including from Roger Ebert, who defended Cage amidst some critics finding his acting "excessive" and earned Cage his second Golden Globe nomination. He hosted an episode of the variety show Saturday Night Live to promote the film, his only time hosting the show.

None of Cage's three films in 1993—Deadfall (directed by his brother Christopher), Amos & Andrew and Red Rock West—performed well at the box office. The comedy Guarding Tess (1994) paired Cage with Shirley MacLaine as a Secret Service agent protecting a former First Lady; however, it was dismissed as being derivative by some critics. He next starred alongside Bridget Fonda in the romantic comedy It Could Happen to You as a cash-strapped police officer who offers to share his lottery winnings with a waitress and then the much-criticized box office flop Christmas comedy Trapped in Paradise with the Saturday Night Live actors Jon Lovitz and Dana Carvey. According to Lovitz, Cage directed portions of the film because its director, George Gallo, offered little direction.

=== 1995–2003: Critical success and action star ===
Cage's performance as a psychopathic criminal kingpin in the crime film Kiss of Death (1995) was seen by many critics as the film's strong point, but his most acclaimed performance yet came in the drama Leaving Las Vegas as an alcoholic screenwriter who falls in love with a prostitute in Las Vegas. The role won Cage the Academy Award for Best Actor and Golden Globe Award for Best Actor – Motion Picture Drama. To prepare for the part, Cage binge drank for two weeks and studied footage of himself.

In 1996, he starred alongside Sean Connery and Ed Harris in Michael Bay's The Rock, the first of a string of action films for Cage. In the film, he played an FBI chemical weapons specialist breaking into Alcatraz federal prison. The Rock was a box office and critical success, with journalist Alexander Larman stating the film "launched Cage into an unexpected vocation as an offbeat action star." Next, he starred in Con Air and Face/Off, two commercially successful action thrillers that were both released in June 1997. In Con Air, Cage led an ensemble cast along with John Cusack and John Malkovich. Jerry Bruckheimer, Con Air's producer, offered the role to Cage after being impressed with his performances in Leaving Las Vegas and The Rock. Cage accepted despite disappointment at not being offered the villain role. Ebert felt Cage "[made] the wrong choice... by playing Cameron Poe as a slow-witted Elvis type who is very, very earnest and approaches every task with tunnel vision; it would have been more fun if he'd been less of a hayseed." John Woo's Face/Off saw Cage and John Travolta star in dual roles as sworn enemies—a terrorist and an FBI agent—who both undergo face transplants to impersonate each other, requiring Cage and Travolta to switch characters. Both performances were praised by critics, with the BBC writing in their review "Travolta and Cage invest their dual roles with physical subtleties that reflect the other actor's character."

After starring in these action films back-to-back, Cage decided to "return to more serious fare" in the romantic fantasy film City of Angels (1998), a loose remake of the German film Wings of Desire (1987). Critics were split on the film and Cage's performance, with reviews ranging from describing him as "endlessly resourceful" to "[resembling] a serial killer more than an angel." Brian De Palma's thriller Snake Eyes, his second film of 1998, starred Cage as a corrupt detective. The film was met with mixed reviews, which were largely critical of its screenplay. Cage starred in Martin Scorsese's 1999 New York City paramedic drama Bringing Out the Dead.

Most of Cage's movies that have achieved financial success were in the action/adventure genre. These include The Rock, Con Air, Face/Off, and Gone in 60 Seconds (2000), with Cage as a retired car thief. He took the lead role in the 2000 romantic comedy film The Family Man, in which he played a man forced to deal with an alternate life that had a plot similar to the Christmas movie It's a Wonderful Life (1946), and the 2001 war film Captain Corelli's Mandolin where he learned to play the mandolin from scratch for the part. In 2002, he was again nominated for Oscar and Golden Globe best actor awards for his portrayal of real-life screenwriter Charlie Kaufman and Kaufman's fictional twin Donald in Adaptation.

Cage made his directorial debut in 2002 with Sonny, a low-budget drama starring James Franco as a male prostitute whose mother (Brenda Blethyn) serves as his pimp. Cage had a small role in the film, which received poor reviews and a short run in a limited number of theaters. Cage's producing career includes Shadow of the Vampire (2000), the first effort from Saturn Films. He starred in Ridley Scott's 2003 black comedy crime film Matchstick Men, in which he played a con artist with obsessive–compulsive disorder.

=== 2004–2011: Franchise films ===
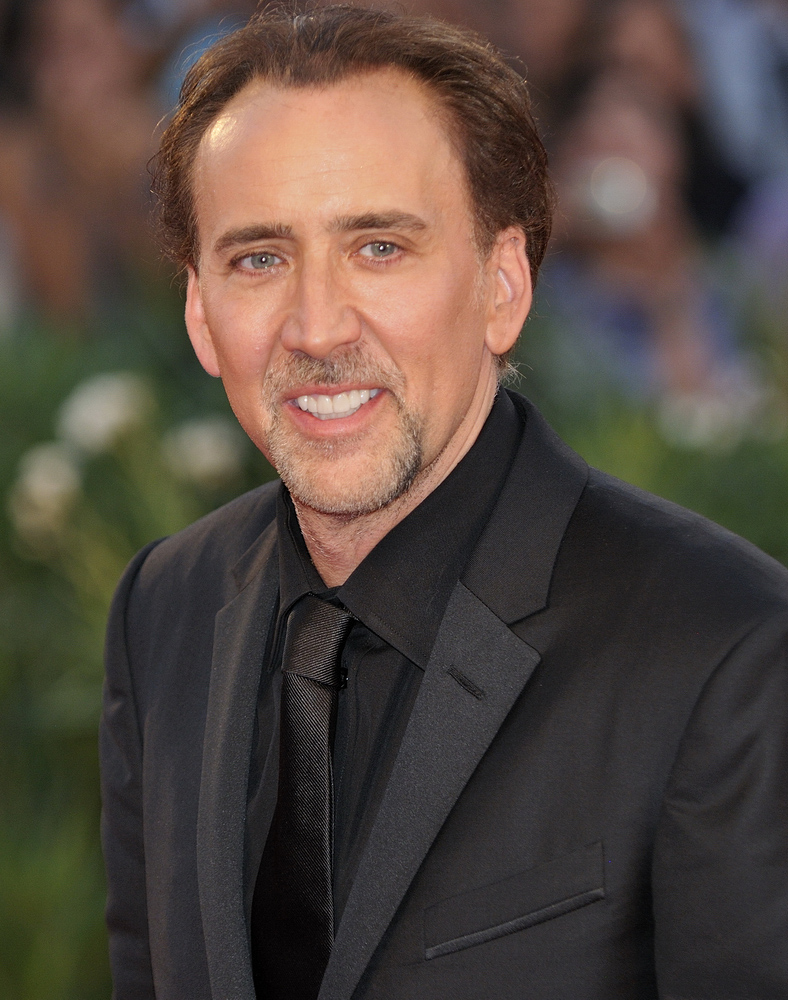
Cage at the 2009 Venice International Film Festival

In his second-highest-grossing film to date, National Treasure (2004), Cage played an eccentric historian who goes on a dangerous adventure to find treasure hidden by the Founding Fathers of the United States. In 2005, two films he headlined, Lord of War and The Weather Man, failed to find a significant audience despite nationwide releases and good reviews for his performances. The 2006 remake of The Wicker Man was very poorly reviewed, and failed to make back its $40-million budget. In early December 2006, Cage announced at the Bahamas International Film Festival that he planned to curtail his future acting endeavors to pursue other interests. On The Dresden Files for the Sci-Fi Channel, Cage is listed as the executive producer. The much-criticized Ghost Rider (2007), based on the Marvel Comics character, fared better, earning more than $45 million (the top earner) during its opening weekend and over $208 million worldwide through the weekend ending on March 25, 2007. Also in 2007, he had a small but notable role as the Chinese criminal mastermind Dr. Fu Manchu in Rob Zombie's fake trailer Werewolf Women of the S.S. from the B-movie double feature Grindhouse, starred in Next, which shared the concept of a glimpse into an alternate timeline with Cage's previous film, The Family Man, and reprised his role as a treasure hunter in National Treasure: Book of Secrets.

In November 2007, Cage was spotted backstage at a Ring of Honor wrestling show in New York City researching for the lead role for The Wrestler. However, Cage dropped out of production shortly afterward because he felt that he did not have enough time to prepare for the role and director Darren Aronofsky preferred Mickey Rourke for the lead role. Rourke would go on to receive an Academy Award nomination for his performance. In an interview with /Film, Aronofsky said of Cage's decision to leave the film that "Nic was a complete gentleman, and he understood that my heart was with Mickey and he stepped aside. I have so much respect for Nic Cage as an actor and I think it really could have worked with Nic but ... you know, Nic was incredibly supportive of Mickey and he is old friends with Mickey and really wanted to help with this opportunity, so he pulled himself out of the race."

In 2008, Cage appeared as Joe, a contract killer who undergoes a change of heart while on a work outing in Bangkok, in the film Bangkok Dangerous. The film is shot by the Pang Brothers and has a distinctly South-East Asian flavor. In 2009, Cage starred in the science fiction thriller Knowing, directed by Alex Proyas. In the film, he plays an MIT professor who examines the contents of a time capsule unearthed at his son's elementary school. Startling predictions found inside the capsule that have already come true lead him to believe that the world is going to end at the close of the week and that he and his son are somehow involved in the destruction. The film received mixed reviews but was the box office winner on its opening weekend.

Also in 2009, Cage starred in the film Bad Lieutenant: Port of Call New Orleans, directed by acclaimed German director Werner Herzog. He portrayed a corrupt police officer with gambling, drug and alcohol addictions. The film was very well received by critics, holding a rating of 87% positive reviews on review aggregator website Rotten Tomatoes. Cage was lauded for his performance, with Michael Phillips of the Chicago Tribune writing "Herzog has found his ideal interpreter, a performer whose truth lies deep in the artifice of performance: ladies and gentlemen, Nicolas Cage, at his finest." This film reunited Cage with Eva Mendes, who played his love interest in Ghost Rider. In 2010, Cage starred in The Sorcerer's Apprentice, in which he played the sorcerer, and the next year, headlined the period piece Season of the Witch, as a 14th-century knight transporting a woman accused of causing the Black Plague to a monastery. In 2011, Cage reprised his role in Ghost Rider's sequel Ghost Rider: Spirit of Vengeance.

=== 2012–2017: Career setbacks ===
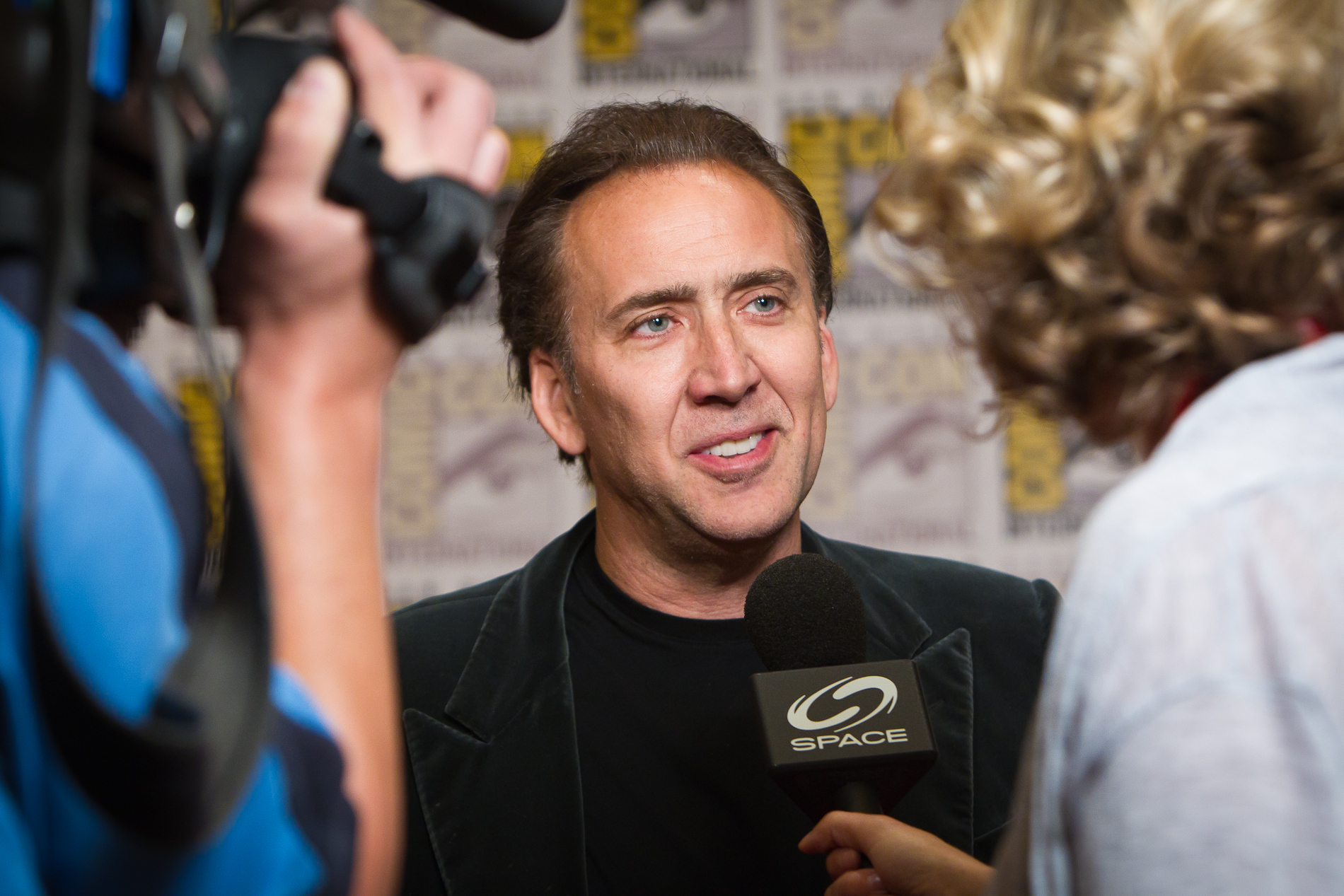
Cage at the 2011 San Diego Comic-Con

In 2013, Cage was involved in many projects. Notable films including animated film The Croods, in which he voiced a character named Grug Crood. The Croods received positive reviews from critics and was a box-office success grossing $585 million against a budget of $135 million. He starred as main character in The Frozen Ground, a thriller crime drama film directed and written by Scott Walker in his directorial debut, based on the crimes of real-life Alaskan serial killer Robert Hansen. The film, reunited him with Cusack, depicts an Alaskan State Trooper, played by Cage, seeking to apprehend Hansen, played by Cusack, by partnering with a young woman who escaped from Hansen's clutches. The film has received mixed reviews though Cage's performance was cited as a highlight and solid. He also starred in Joe, an independent crime drama film directed and co-produced by David Gordon Green, adaptation from Larry Brown's 1991 novel of the same name. In this film Nicolas Cage is a tormented man who hires a 15-year-old boy (played by Tye Sheridan) and protects him from his abusive father. The film premiered at the 70th Venice International Film Festival on August 30, 2013, with a subsequent screening at the 2013 Toronto International Film Festival. It was a box office flop, grossing only $2.36 million from a $4 million budget, but received critical acclaim from critics, who praised Cage's performance and Green's direction.

The 2016 black comedy Dog Eat Dog, Cage's second film with Paul Schrader, reunited him with Willem Dafoe (after Wild at Heart) as a pair of ex-convicts hired to kidnap a baby. The film had its premiere as the closing entry for the Directors' Fortnight section at the 2016 Cannes Film Festival on May 20, 2016. It was released on November 4, 2016, in the United States. Peter Bradshaw of The Guardian gave the film four out of five stars, writing, "It's the right director for the right project and the result is Schrader's best for years: a lairy, nasty, tasty crime thriller built on black-comic chaos." Todd McCarthy of The Hollywood Reporter wrote, "A rare film to have been shot in Cleveland, Dog Eat Dog definitely looks like it was shot on the cheap but puts what it needs to up on the screen with vigor and wit."

Cage starred alongside Selma Blair and Anne Winters in Brian Taylor's horror comedy film, Mom and Dad, which premiered in the Midnight Madness section at the 2017 Toronto International Film Festival. It was released in theaters on January 19, 2018, and received positive reviews from critics, with review aggregator Rotten Tomatoes defining his performance as "over-the-top." Director John Waters appreciated the film, naming Mom and Dad as one of the best movies of 2018, placing it fourth on his personal top list.

=== 2018–present: Critical resurgence ===
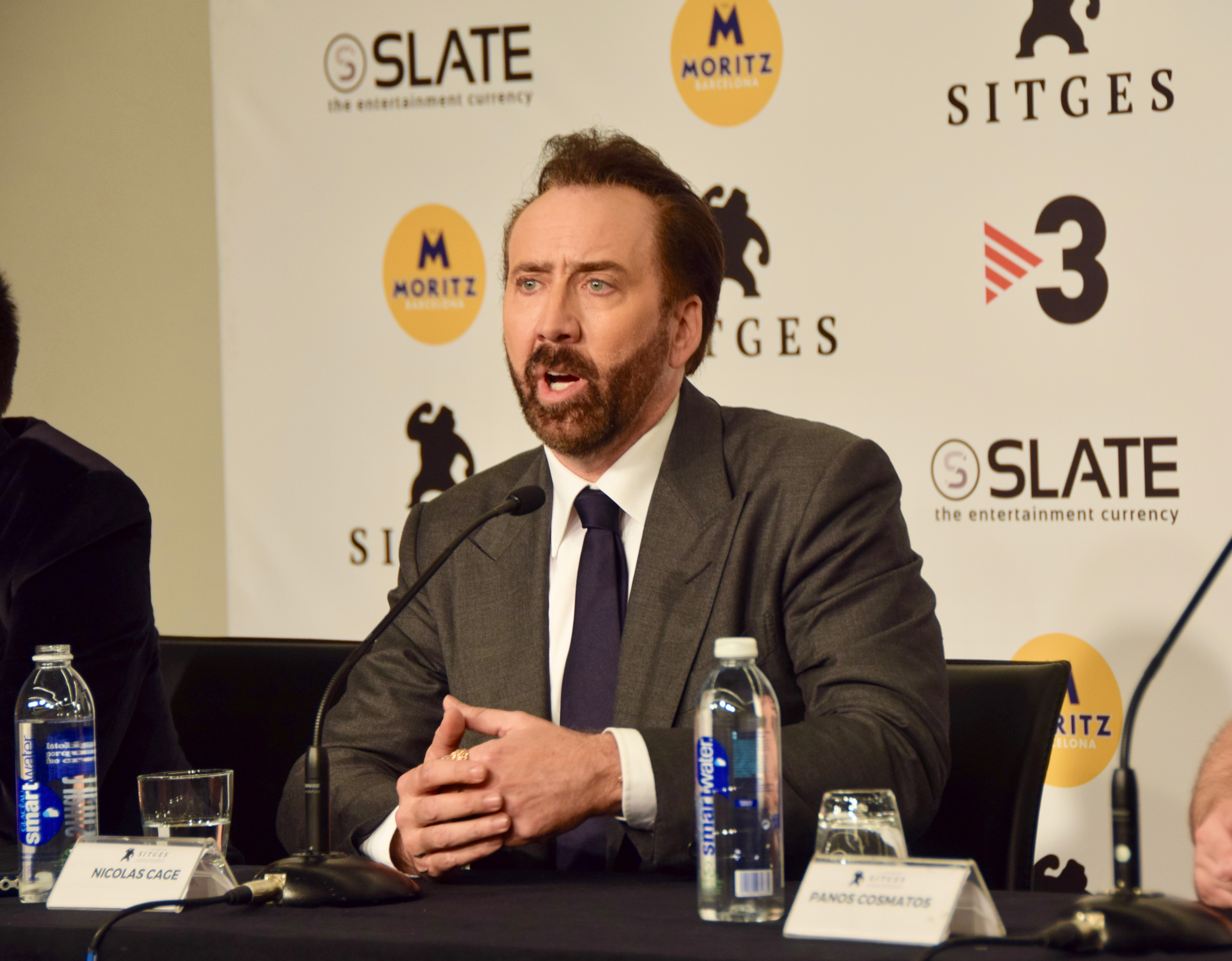
Cage at the 2018 Sitges Film Festival

In 2018, Cage starred in the action thriller film Mandy, which premiered on January 19 at the 2018 Sundance Film Festival. Nick Allen of RogerEbert.com praised the movie, writing that "for all of the endless feral performances that Cage has given, in movies good, bad and forgettable, Cosmatos' style-driven, '80s-tastic passion for weird worlds and characters takes full advantage of Cage's greatness, and then some." In October, Mandy's producer Elijah Wood announced his intention to size up an Oscar campaign for Nicolas Cage and for composer Jóhann Jóhannsson (who died in February of that year) but the film was disqualified because it was also released on Video On Demand on September 14.

Later that year, Cage voiced Clark Kent / Superman in the animated film Teen Titans Go! To the Movies. He had originally been slated to portray Superman in Tim Burton's canceled Superman film, Superman Lives, in the 1990s. He voiced an alternate monochromatic 1930s universe version of Peter Parker / Spider-Man Noir in Spider-Man: Into the Spider-Verse (2018). Cage based his vocal performance on films of Humphrey Bogart, James Cagney, and Edward G. Robinson. On January 28, 2019, Viktor and Irina Yelchin premiered a documentary about their son Anton Yelchin, Love, Antosha, at the 2019 Sundance Film Festival. The documentary was directed by Garret Price and contains various interviews with some of Anton's friends and collaborators such as Kristen Stewart, J. J. Abrams, Chris Pine, Jennifer Lawrence, Jodie Foster, John Cho and Martin Landau. Cage starred as the Narrator of the film, reading various writings by Yelchin.

In December 2018, it was announced that Cage had signed to play the lead role for Richard Stanley's Color Out of Space, based on the short story "The Colour Out of Space" by H. P. Lovecraft. This was Stanley's first feature film directed since his firing from The Island of Dr. Moreau (1996). Color Out of Space premiered on September 7, 2019, in the Midnight Madness portion of the 2019 Toronto International Film Festival, where Cage was awarded for his role with the Creative Coalition's Spotlight Initiative Award. Following select preview screenings on January 22, the film was released in 81 theaters in the United States on January 24, 2020.

In December 2018, it was announced that Sion Sono was working on his first overseas production and English-language debut, Prisoners of the Ghostland, starring Nicolas Cage. Cage said the film "might be the wildest movie I've ever made." Its plot revolves around a notorious criminal, Hero (played by Cage), who is sent to rescue the governor's adopted granddaughter, who has disappeared into a dark region called Ghostland. The film had its world premiere at the 2021 Sundance Film Festival on January 31, 2021.

In May 2020, it was announced that Cage would be playing the role of Joe Exotic in a scripted eight-episode Tiger King series, written and executive produced by Dan Lagana. It was announced that the project was scrapped in July 2021. In 2013, it was confirmed that Nicolas Cage would reprise his role as Grug in The Croods: A New Age, which was released in 2020.

Cage produced and starred in the 2021 film Pig, where he plays Robin "Rob" Feld, a former chef turned reclusive truffle-forager who must return to his past in Portland in search of his beloved foraging pig after she is kidnapped. Cage received critical acclaim for his performance and earned a second nomination for the Critics' Choice Movie Award for Best Actor. He gained further acclaim for portraying a fictionalized version of himself in the 2022 action comedy film The Unbearable Weight of Massive Talent as well as for his portrayal of Paul, a professor who begins appearing in the dreams of others, in the 2023 Dream Scenario, resulting in his fifth Golden Globe nomination.

In the 2023 horror comedy film Renfield, inspired by the 1897 Bram Stoker novel Dracula, Cage portrays Count Dracula opposite Nicholas Hoult's Renfield. Also in 2023, Cage was included as a playable character in the horror video game Dead by Daylight. Cage reprised his role as Clark Kent / Superman in the 2023 film The Flash in a cameo appearance as an alternate version of the superhero. Cage shot his scenes through volumetric capture and CGI was used to de-age him.

In July 2024, Cage starred as the titular serial killer in the horror thriller film Longlegs, which he produced. In August, Cage signed on to play legendary gridiron football coach and broadcaster John Madden in the Amazon MGM Studios film Madden. Cage headlines the 2026 television series Spider-Noir for MGM+ and Amazon Prime Video, portraying a live-action version of Spider-Man Noir, named Ben Reilly, in an alternate 1930s New York City.

== Acting style ==
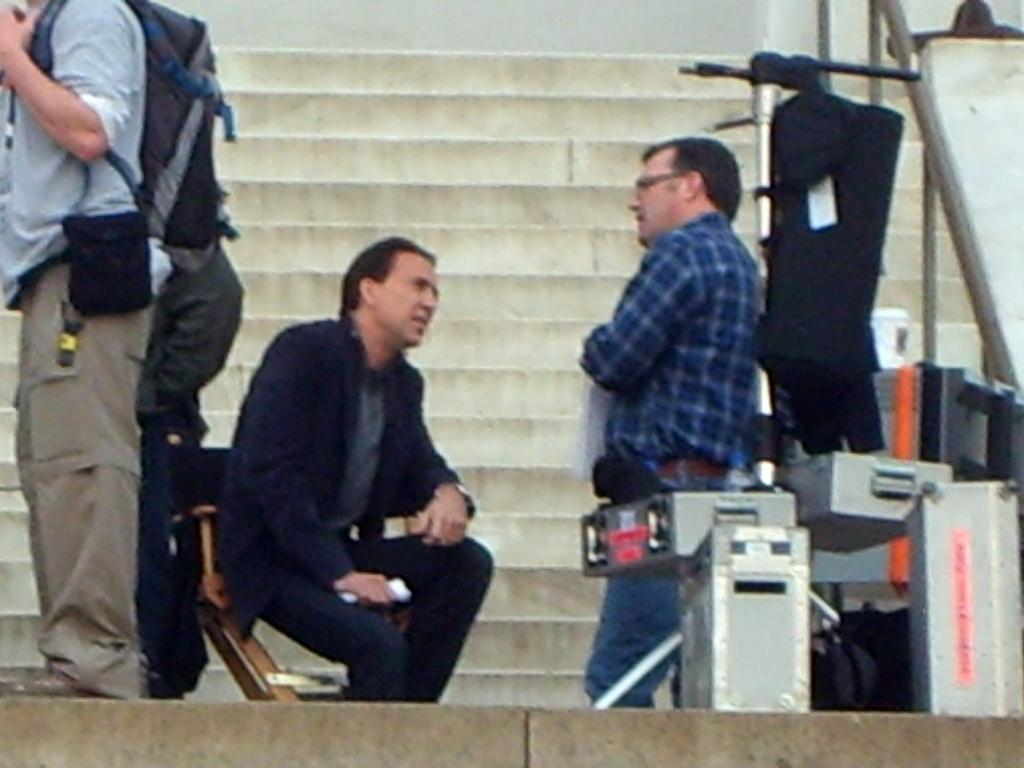
Cage on the set of National Treasure: Book of Secrets

The fine, ever-elusive art of Nouveau Shamanic — Will Ashton, CinemaBlend

"Nouveau Shamanic" is a style of acting developed by Cage. He has said it is to increase one's imagination without restraint, in avoidance of experiencing the sense of being ingenuous.

The process itself is about: How do you augment your imagination in a healthy way? So that you can believe you're these characters... You don't feel like you're acting, you feel like you're being.

— Nicolas Cage

In the film Vampire's Kiss Cage moved from method acting to "Nouveau Shamanic". The scene where Cage recites the alphabet to his psychiatrist was a result of acting out of impulse. Raising Arizona showcased the physicality of Nouveau Shamanic. Ghost Rider: Spirit of Vengeance is a display of how the method leads to impulse decisions fueled by an energy one could only garner naturally. Cage was asked if any of his numerous pets influence his acting, to which he replied "The cobras, definitely. They would try to hypnotize you by going side to side, and when I did Ghost Rider: Spirit of Vengeance, that's something my character does before he attacks. Animals are fun places to get inspiration."

== Reception ==
In Cage's hands, cartoonish moments are imbued with real emotion and real emotions become cartoons. Everything – from individual scenes down to single lines of dialogue – feel like they have been embraced as opportunities for creation. Cage is usually interesting even when his films are not. He is erratic and unpredictable; he is captivating and he is capricious. He is a performer. He is a troubadour. He is a jazz musician.

— Luke Buckmaster, The Guardian

According to The Guardian film critic Luke Buckmaster, "any casual observer can see that Cage is entertaining, charismatic and wildly flamboyant." Attributing it partly to the "well-cultured" background of Cage's family, Buckmaster said the actor "is clearly attracted to grotesque characters and is celebrated for his wild and unhinged approach to them. He has the presence of a leading man, and the eccentricities of a character actor." Actor Ethan Hawke stated in 2013 that Cage is "the only actor since Marlon Brando that's actually done anything new with the art", crediting him for taking film audiences "away from an obsession with naturalism into a kind of presentation style of acting that I imagine was popular with the old troubadours." In 2018, Italian cartoonist Zerocalcare dedicated a comic strip to Nicolas Cage, describing him as one of the incarnation of the outcasts of 1990s films.

Film director David Lynch described him as "the jazz musician of American acting." Many critics have accused Cage of overacting. Others, including Cage himself, have described his intentionally extreme performances as "mega-acting". After the actor's series of mainstream-marketed thriller films during the late 1990s, Sean Penn told The New York Times in 1999 that Cage was "no longer an actor" but "more like a performer." Despite this, in his speech after winning the Oscar for his performance in Mystic River, Penn described Cage's performance in Matchstick Men as one of the best of 2003.

During the 2010s, a growing number of critics described Cage as one of the most underrated actors of his generation. In the same years, his performance in various horror films, like Drive Angry, Mom and Dad, Mandy, Color Out of Space, Prisoners of the Ghostland, Willy's Wonderland, Arcadian, Renfield, Dream Scenario, and Longlegs, made him a scream king.

Cage's work across diverse film genres has gained him a significant cult following. He has gained renewed critical recognition for his starring roles in films in the 2020s, such as Mandy (2018), Pig (2021), The Unbearable Weight of Massive Talent (2022), Dream Scenario (2023), and Longlegs (2024).

Cage was voted one of the 50 greatest actors of all time in a 2022 readers' poll by Empire magazine.

== Acting credits and accolades ==
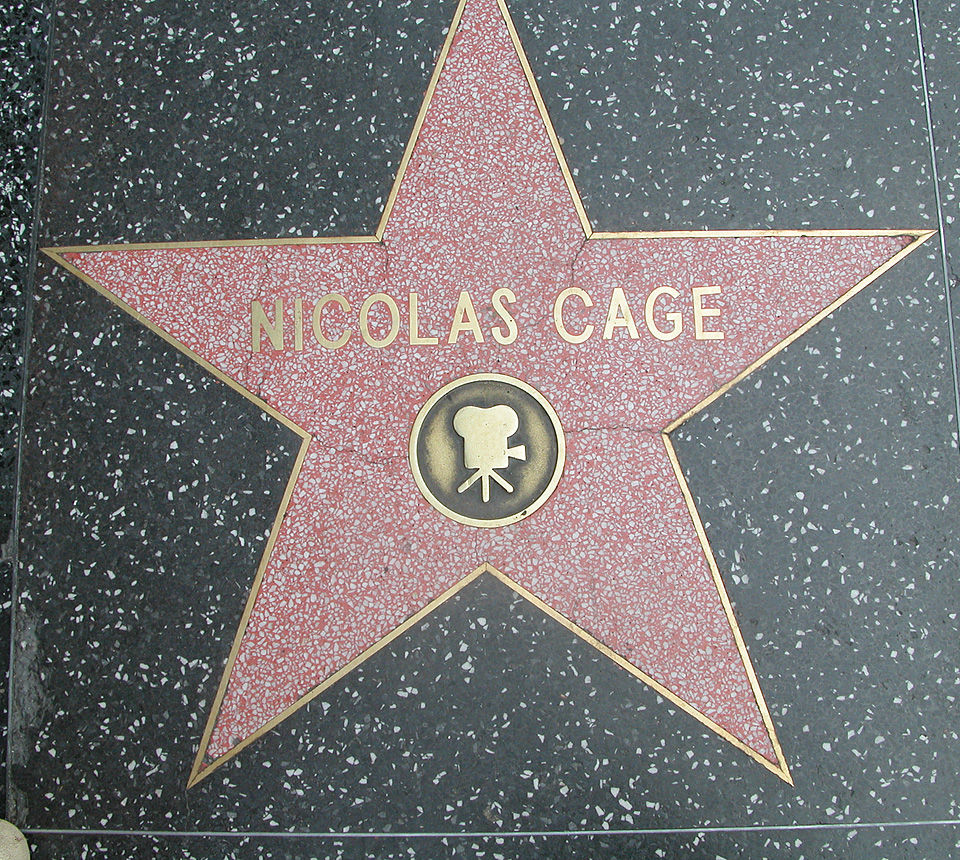
Cage's star on the Hollywood Walk of Fame

For his contributions to the film industry, Cage was inducted into the Hollywood Walk of Fame in 1998 with a motion pictures star located at 7021 Hollywood Boulevard. In May 2001, Cage was awarded an Honorary Doctorate in Fine Arts by California State University, Fullerton. He spoke at the commencement ceremony. Cage has also been nominated for an Academy Award twice. He won an Academy Award for Best Actor for his role in the film Leaving Las Vegas in 1995. He was nominated for a second one for his role in the film Adaptation in 2002.

He also won a Golden Globe award, Screen Actors Guild award, and many more awards for Leaving Las Vegas. He has received nominations by the Golden Globe, Screen Actors Guild, and BAFTA for his films Adaptation, Honeymoon in Vegas, and Moonstruck. He has also won and been nominated for many other awards.

== Personal life ==
=== Relationships and family ===
In 1988, Cage began dating actress Christina Fulton, with whom he has a son, Weston Coppola Cage (born in 1990). Weston has been the vocalist of two symphonic black metal bands, Eyes of Noctrum and Arsh Anubis. Weston also appeared in his father's film Lord of War as a helicopter mechanic, and in the 2014 film Rage as Nicolas' character's younger self. Through Weston, Cage has two grandsons born in 2014 and 2016. In July 2024, Weston was arrested for assaulting numerous people with a deadly weapon, including his mother and his best friend; he was released on a $150,000 bond and was later sentenced to two years in a mental health diversion program.

Cage's first wife was actress Patricia Arquette, whom he married in April 1995 and divorced in 2001. Cage first met Arquette at Canter's Deli in 1987 with his friend, actor Crispin Glover. Minutes after meeting her, he and Glover both claimed they would marry Arquette one day. To prove he was more serious in his proposal than Glover, Cage sent Arquette a series of rare gifts, including J. D. Salinger's autograph and a Lisu tribe wedding costume. The two would later have a chance encounter again at Canter's Deli in 1995, marrying two weeks later.

His second marriage was to singer-songwriter Lisa Marie Presley, daughter of Elvis and Priscilla Presley; an Elvis fan, Cage used Presley as the inspiration for his performance in Wild at Heart. They married in Kamuela, Hawaii, on August 10, 2002, and filed for divorce 107 days later on November 25, 2002. The divorce was finalized on May 24, 2004.

Cage's third wife was Alice Kim. They were married at a private ranch in northern California on July 30, 2004. She gave birth to their son Kal-El in 2005. They divorced in January 2016.

In March 2019, Cage married Erika Koike in Las Vegas, only to file for annulment four days later, stating he was too intoxicated to understand his own actions and that Koike failed to disclose "the full nature and extent of her relationship with another person." He was granted a divorce from Koike three months later.

On February 16, 2021, Cage married Riko Shibata (芝田 璃子, Shibata Riko). Their daughter August was born in 2022.

=== Political views and religious beliefs ===
Cage grew up in a family of Catholic background, but he does not talk about religion publicly and refuses to answer religion-connected questions in his interviews. When asked about whether he could relate to his character's lack of religious belief in Knowing, Cage replied, "You know, any of my personal beliefs or opinions run the risk of impinging on your own relationship with the movie. I think movies are best left enigmatic. Left raising more questions than answers. I don't want to ever preach, so that's what you get from a movie; that's far more interesting than anything I could offer."

During his visit to University of California, Santa Cruz, he stated that he is not a politically active actor and that he can do it in his work as he learned "more about nuclear power from the movie The China Syndrome." Cage endorsed Andrew Yang for president during the 2020 election.

At one point in his life, Cage had decided that he wanted to develop the philosophical aspect of his nature, and he went on a quest to find the Holy Grail. Cage traveled to England to look for it, but also looked at some areas of the United States.

=== Charitable activities ===
Cage has been called one of the most generous stars in Hollywood. He donated $2 million to Amnesty International for them to use to offer rehabilitation shelters, medical services and psychological and reintegration services to some of the 300,000 children forced to fight in conflicts across the world. He has also donated $1 million to the victims of Hurricane Katrina. He became the first artist to support ArtWorks, an artist engagement program to raise awareness of fundamental rights at work, including freedom from slavery and from child labor. During 2023, while filming The Surfer in Western Australia, Cage personally phoned in an AU$5,000 donation to the Channel Seven Perth Telethon.

Cage has also been honored with a Humanitarian award from the United Nations for his works and appointed as a UN ambassador for Global Justice in 2009 and again in 2013. He led a campaign around the film Lord of War to raise awareness about international arms control, supported "Heal the Bay", the United Negro College Fund efforts, and the Royal United Hospital's Forever Friends Appeal to build intensive care units for babies.

=== Interests ===
Cage, an avid comic book fan, auctioned a collection of 400 vintage comics through Heritage Auctions for over $1.6 million in 2002. In 2007, he created a comic book with his son Weston, called Voodoo Child, which was published by Virgin Comics. Cage is a fan and collector of painter and underground comic artist Robert Williams. He has written introductions for Juxtapoz magazine and purchased the painting Death on the Boards.

=== Saturn Films ===
Saturn Films
- Type: Film production company
- Industry: Film
- Founded: 2000; 26 years ago
- Founder: Nicolas Cage
- Fate: Active
- Headquarters: United States
- Owner: Nicolas Cage
- Parent: Intermedia (until 2006)

Saturn Films is a production company referred to by one source as "the production shingle of Nicolas Cage" and often referred to as "Cage's Saturn Films". Michael Nilon has been referred to as Cage's "producing partner through" Saturn Films. Norm Golightly was president of the firm for twelve years, ending in 2009. In 2001, Saturn was referred to as "Intermedia-based", suggesting it was part of Intermedia, which was defunct as of 2006.

=== Real estate and tax problems ===
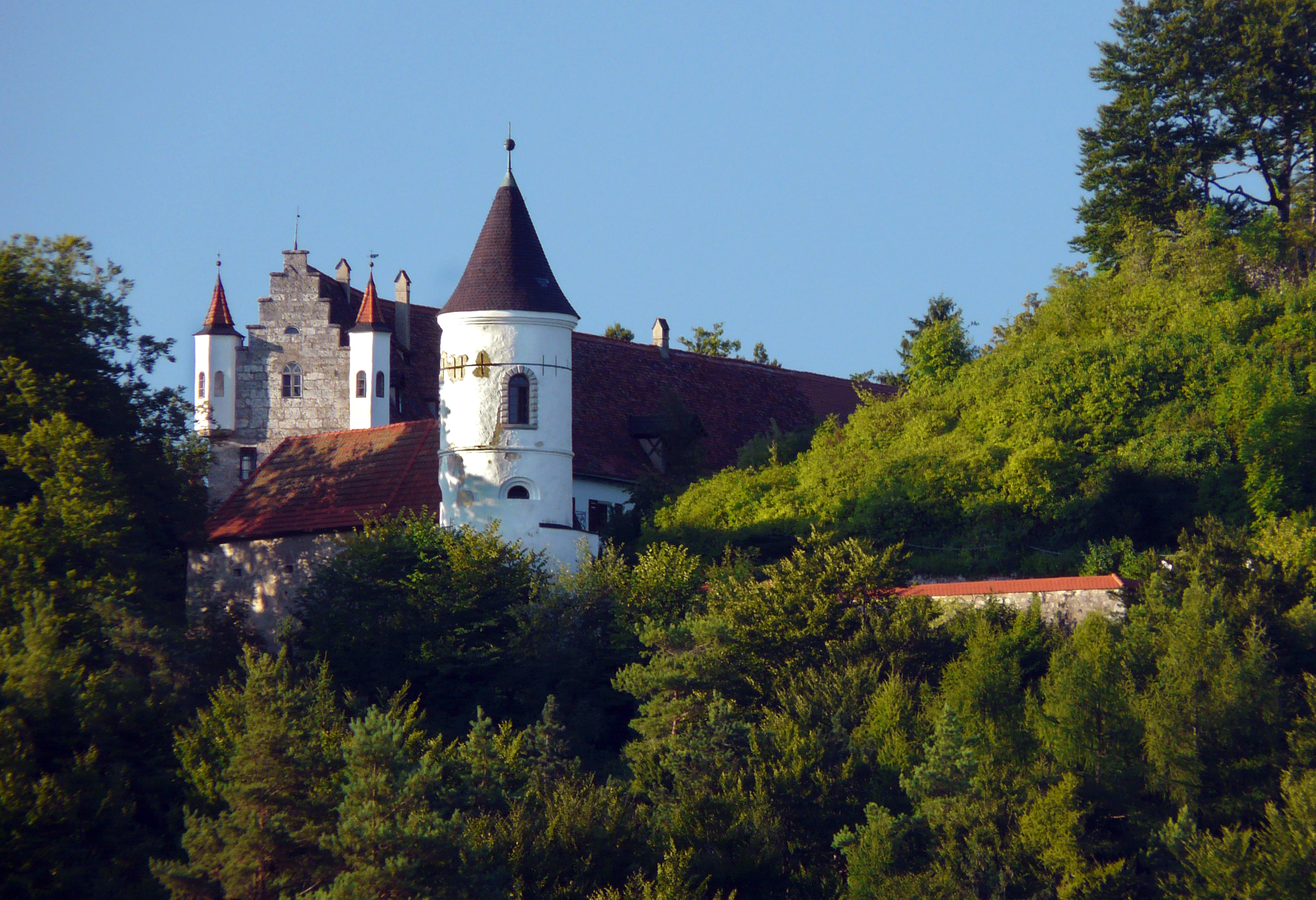
Schloss Neidstein in Bavaria was owned by Cage between 2007 and 2009.

Cage was once considered one of Hollywood's highest-paid actors, earning $40 million in 2009 according to Forbes, although he failed to make Forbes' Top 10 List in 2014. In 2004 he bought a property on Paradise Island, Bahamas. In May 2006, he bought a 40-acre (16 ha) island in the Exuma archipelago, some 85 miles (137 km) southeast of Nassau and close to a similar island owned by Faith Hill and Tim McGraw. He bought the medieval castle Schloss Neidstein in the Oberpfalz region in Germany in 2006 and sold it in 2009 for $2.5 million. His grandmother was German, living in Cochem an der Mosel.

In August 2007, Cage purchased "Grey Craig", a 24,000-square-foot (2,200 m^{2}) brick-and-stone country manor in Middletown, Rhode Island. With an estate occupying 26 acres (11 ha), the home has 12 bedrooms and 10 full bathrooms and overlooks the Atlantic Ocean. It borders the Norman Bird Sanctuary to the west. The sale ranked among the state of Rhode Island's most expensive residential purchases. Also in 2007, Cage purchased Midford Castle in Somerset, England. Shortly after selling his German castle, Cage also put his homes in Rhode Island, Louisiana, Nevada, and California, as well as a $7-million island in the Bahamas, on the market.

On July 14, 2009, the Internal Revenue Service filed documents in New Orleans in connection with a federal tax lien against property owned by Cage in Louisiana, concerning unpaid federal taxes. The IRS alleged that Cage failed to pay over $6.2 million in federal income tax for the year 2007. In addition, the Internal Revenue Service had another lien for more than $350,000 in unpaid taxes dating from 2002 to 2004. Cage filed a $20-million lawsuit on October 16, 2009, against his business manager, Samuel J. Levin, alleging negligence and fraud. Reuters said that the lawsuit stated that Levin "had failed to pay taxes when they were due and had placed [Cage] in speculative and risky real estate investments 'resulting in (the actor) suffering catastrophic losses.'" Cage also faced separate lawsuits from East West Bank and Red Curb Investments for unpaid, multi-million dollar loans.

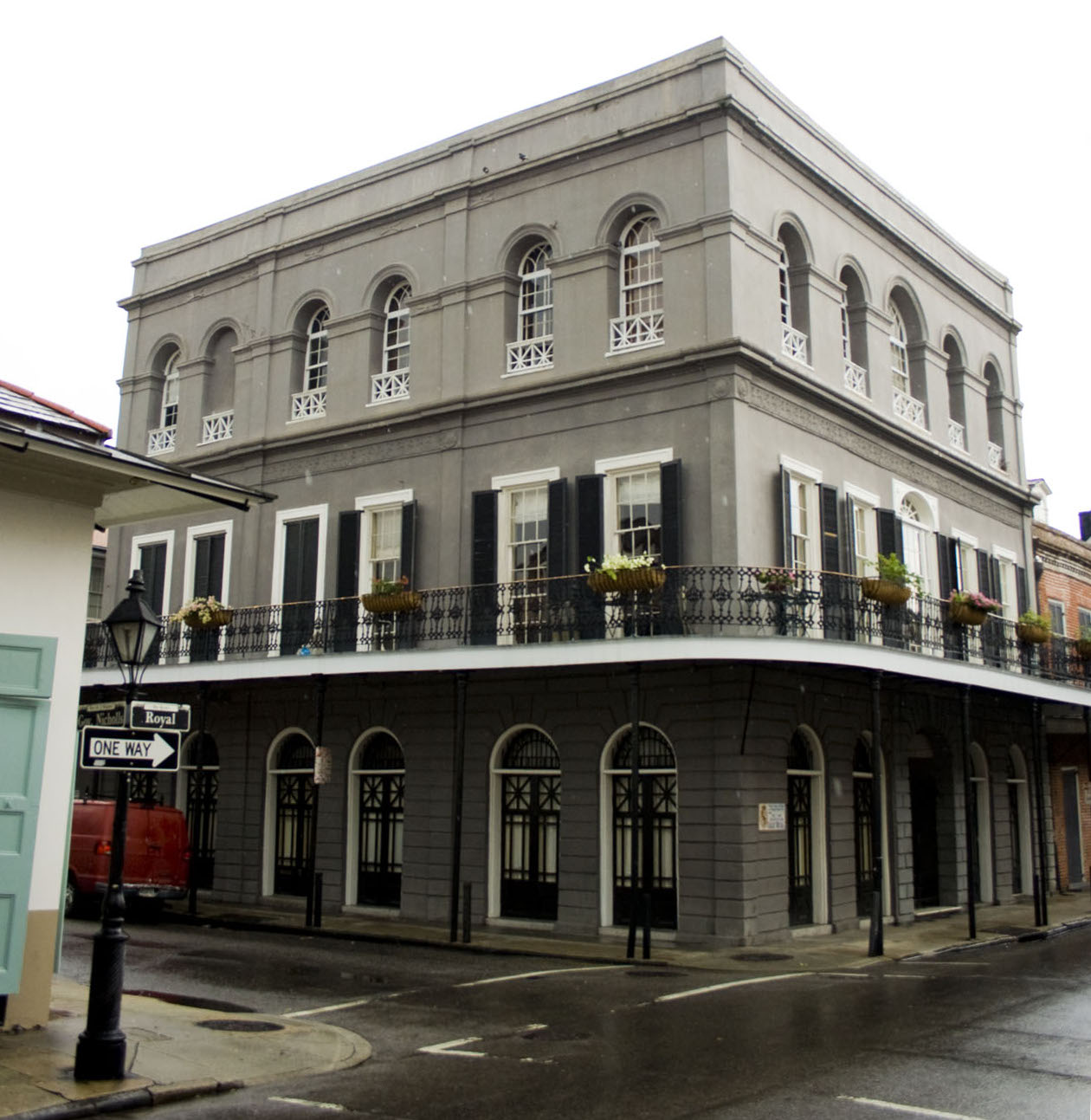
The LaLaurie Mansion in New Orleans was purchased anonymously by Cage in 2007 and sold in 2009.

Samuel Levin filed a counter-complaint and responded to the lawsuit in a filing stating that he warned Cage that he was living beyond his means and urged him to spend less. Levin's filing states that "instead of listening to Levin, cross-defendant Cage (Coppola) spent most of his free time shopping for high ticket purchases, and wound up with 15 personal residences." Levin's complaint continued: "Likewise, Levin advised Coppola against buying a Gulfstream jet, against buying and owning a flotilla of yachts, against buying and owning a squadron of Rolls Royces, against buying millions of dollars in jewelry and art."

In his filing, Levin said that in 2007, Cage's "shopping spree entailed the purchase of three additional residences at a total cost of more than $33 million; the purchase of 22 automobiles (including 9 Rolls Royces), 12 purchases of expensive jewelry, and 47 purchases of artwork and exotic items." One of those items was a dinosaur skull of a Tarbosaurus. After discovering that it was stolen, he returned it to the Mongolian authorities.

According to Cage, he owned the "Most Haunted House in America", a home located in the French Quarter of New Orleans, Louisiana. Known as "The LaLaurie House" after its former owner Delphine LaLaurie, the house was foreclosed and sold at auction on November 12, 2009, along with another New Orleans property for a total of $5.5 million, in the wake of Cage's financial problems. His Bel Air home, which had six loans totaling $18 million on it, failed to sell at an April 2010 foreclosure auction despite an opening offer of $10.4 million, substantially less than the $35 million that Cage had originally tried to sell it for. The home, built in 1940 for $110,000 (equivalent to about $2 million in 2025), had been owned at different times by Dean Martin and singer Tom Jones.

The home eventually sold in November 2010 for $10.5 million. Another home in Nevada also faced foreclosure auction. In November 2011, Cage sold his Action Comics #1 in an online auction managed by Heritage Auctions for a record-breaking $2.16 million (the previous record being $1.5 million), to assist paying his tax liens and other debts. Cage purchased the comic in 1997 for $110,000. The comic had been stolen from him in 2000, and Cage had received an insurance payment on the item. In March 2011, it was found in a storage locker in the San Fernando Valley and was verified by ComicConnect.com to be the copy sold to Cage previously. Worth around $25 million by May 2017, Cage was reportedly "taking [film] roles left and right" in order to pay off his remaining debts. By 2022, Cage confirmed that he had finally paid off his debts and intended to be more selective with his film roles.

=== Legal issues ===
Kathleen Turner wrote in her 2008 memoir, Send Your Roses, that Cage had stolen a chihuahua and was arrested twice for driving drunk while they filmed Peggy Sue Got Married. Later she admitted Cage did not steal a chihuahua and stated that she was sorry. Cage won a libel action against Turner, her publisher Headline Publishing Group, and Associated Newspapers (whose allegations the Daily Mail had repeated when they published an excerpt from the book).

Christina Fulton sued Cage in December 2009 for $13 million and for the house in which she was living. The suit was in response to an order that she leave the dwelling; the order resulted from Cage's financial difficulties. The case was settled in June 2011.

Cage was arrested in New Orleans' French Quarter district on April 15, 2011, for suspicion of domestic abuse battery, disturbing the peace and public intoxication. A police officer was flagged down by onlookers after Cage allegedly grabbed his wife's upper arm while appearing to be under the influence of alcohol. Cage was held in police custody until a bail of $11,000 was posted by Duane "Dog" Chapman. He was later ordered to appear in court on May 31, 2011. The New Orleans District Attorney announced that the charges against Cage had been dropped on May 5, 2011.

== See also ==
- Coppola family tree
- List of oldest and youngest Academy Awards winners and nominees – Youngest winners for Best Lead Actor
