= Georg Wolfgang Franz Panzer =

German botanist and entomologist

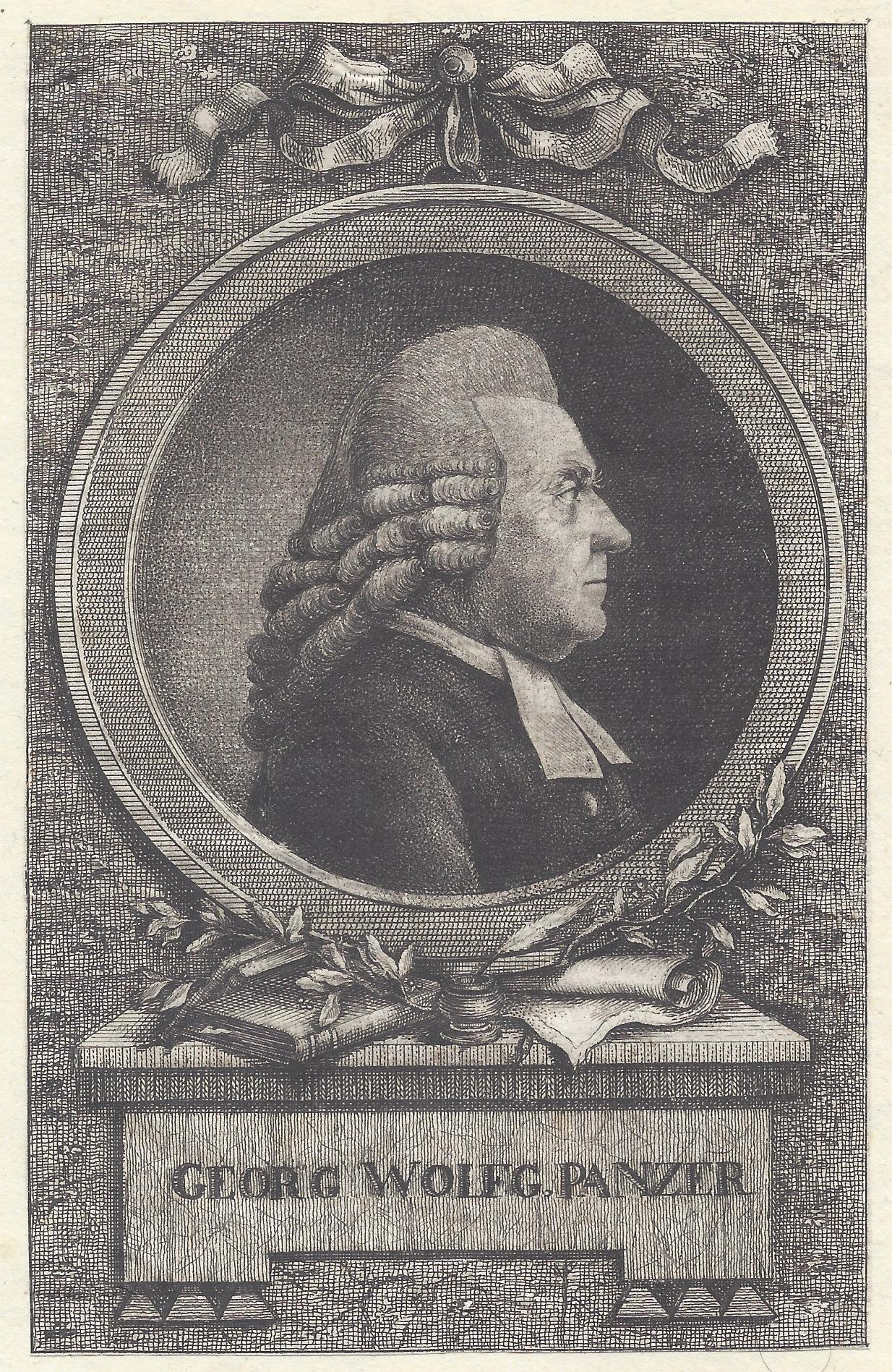
- Born: 31 May 1755; Etzelwang
- Died: 28 June 1829 (aged 74); Hersbruck
- Occupation: Botanist, entomologist, botanical collector

Georg Wolfgang Franz Panzer (31 May 1755 – 28 June 1829) was a German medical doctor, botanist and entomologist. He produced a book on the insect fauna of Germany, illustrated with hand-coloured plates by Jacob Sturm which was produced in 109 parts over a 17 year period beginning in 1796.

== Life and work ==
Panzer was born at Etzelwang in the Upper Palatinate where his father Georg Wolfgang (1729–1805) was a pastor and a distinguished bibliographer, whose Annales Typographici were published between 1793 and 1803.. His mother Rosine Helene (d. 1806) was the daughter of Johann Jakob Jantke. He studied in Nuremberg from 1760 to 1772 followed by studies in medicine which included botany at Erlangen and Altdorf from 1774. His doctoral dissertation of 1777 was titled De Dolore. He continued studies at Vienna, Strasbourg and Switzerland and was admitted to the Collegium medicum in 1780 in Nuremberg. He married Magdalena Clara Vogel in 1780. He promoted the use of cowpox vaccinations from 1795 and promoted the use of the Linnean system in nomenclature. In 1798 he became the official town physician at Hersbruck where he lived until his death.

Panzer had a very species-rich herbarium and was especially involved in a classification of the grasses. He also assembled a very important insect collection which was the basis of a vast work Faunae insectorum germanicae initia (Elements of the insect fauna of Germany), published at Nuremberg between 1796 and 1813. Illustrated by Jacob Sturm (1771–1848), with more than 2,600 hand-colored plates of individual, lifesize insects, this work was issued in 109 parts over the 17-year period of its serial publication, a common pattern for illustrated natural history works in the 18th and 19th centuries.

Panzer was inducted into the Leopoldina Academy in 1789.

== Works ==
- 1781: Observationum Botanicarum specimen
- 1783: Beytrag zur Geschichte des ostindischen Brodbaums, mit einer systematischen Beschreibung desselben … Nebst einer Kupfertafel
- 1785: De dolore (Altorfi)
- 1787: Versuch einer natürlichen Geschichte der Laub- und Lebermoosse nach Schmidelschen-Schreberschen und Hedwigschen Beobachtungen
- 1793–1813: Faunae Insectorum Germanicae Initia, oder Deutschlands Insecten, 109 Teile, 2640 Kupfertafeln von Jacob Sturm, herausgegeben von Dr G. W. F. Panzer. Zweyte Auflage. [Fortgesetzt bis 1844 von] Dr G. A. W. Herrich-Schaffer
- 1794: Faunae Insectorum Americes Borealis prodomus, etc.
- 1795: Deutschlands Insectenfaune oder entomologisches Taschenbuch für das Jahr 1795
- 1802: Symbolae Entomologicae … Cum tabulis XII. aeneis
- 1802: Viro … venerabili G. W. Panzero parenti suo … gratulatur, simulque quaedam de D. J. G. Volcamero, … additis duabus ad illum epistolis H. Boerhaave et I. Pitt[on] Tournefort, … exponit D. G. W. F. Panzer
- 1804: Systematische Nomenclatur uber weiland … J. C. Schaeffers naturlich ausgemahlte Abbildungen regensburgischer Insekten, etc. (D. J. C. Schaefferi iconum insectorum circa Ratisbonam indigenorum enumeratio systematica opera et studio G. W. F. P.)
- 1805: Kritische Revision der Insektenfaune Deutschlands (2 Bändchen)
- 1813: Index entomologicus sistens omnes insectorum species in G. W. F. Panzeri Fauna Insectorum Germanica descriptas atque delineatas … adjectis … observationibus. Pars 1. Eleutherata
- 1813: Ideen zu einer künftigen Revision der Gattungen der Gräser. L.P.
