= A. aemula =

A. aemula may refer to:

- Acacia aemula, a species of flowering plant
- Ademula aemula, a species of assassin bug in the subfamily Emesinae
- Aeranthes aemula, a species of orchid
- Agathosma aemula, a species of flowering plant in the genus Agathosma
- Alchemilla aemula, a species of flowering plant in the genus Alchemilla
- Anisochaeta aemula, a species of earthworm in the genus Anisochaeta
- Aporocassida aemula, a species of leaf beetle in the subfamily Cassidinae
- Argiope aemula, a species of spider
- Artace aemula, a species of moth in the genus Artace
- Aspalathus aemula, a species of flowering plant in the genus Aspalathus
- Asterina aemula, a species of fungus in the genus Asterina
- Atheta aemula, a species of rove beetle in the genus Atheta
- Autographa aemula, a species of moth
