= Schreckstoff =

Alarm substance in ostariophysan fish

Chemical structure of hypoxanthine-3N-oxide (H3NO), a major component of the "schreckstoff" mixture

In 1938, the Austrian ethologist Karl von Frisch made his first report on the existence of the chemical alarm signal known as Schreckstoff (fright substance) in minnows. An alarm signal is a response produced by an individual, the "sender", reacting to a hazard that warns other animals, the receivers, of danger. This chemical alarm signal is released only when the sender incurs mechanical damage, such as when it has been caught by a predator, and is detected by the olfactory system. When this signal reaches the receivers, they perceive a greater predation risk and exhibit an antipredator response. Since populations of fish exhibiting this trait survive more successfully, the trait is maintained via natural selection. While the evolution of this signal was once a topic of great debate, recent evidence suggests schreckstoff evolved as a defense against environmental stressors such as pathogens, parasites, and UVB radiation and that it was later co-opted by predators and prey as a chemical signal.

== Background ==
Chemical alarm systems have been identified in a number of different taxa, including gastropods, echinoderms, amphibians and fishes. One of the most well-studied chemical alarm signals is schreckstoff, the use of which is widespread in the superorder Ostariophysi (e.g., minnows, characins, catfishes, etc.). About 64% of all freshwater fish species and 27% of all fish species worldwide are found in the ostariophysan superorder, which highlights the widespread use and importance of this chemical alarm system in fishes.

== Schreckstoff in ostariophysans ==
The production of schreckstoff has been shown to be metabolically expensive and is therefore part of a conditional strategy that can only be employed by individuals with access to sufficient resources. One putative active ingredient in schreckstoff is hypoxanthine-3N-oxide (H3NO), which may be produced in club cells which will henceforth be referred to as "alarm substance cells". The nitrogen oxide functional group was found to be the main chemical trigger of antipredator behavior in receivers. Schreckstoff is a mixture, and fragments of a glycosaminoglycan, chondroitin sulfate, are able to trigger fear responses. The precursor polysaccharide is a component of mucus, and fragments are proposed to be produced during injury. Like schreckstoff obtained from skin extract, chondroitin sulfate activates a subset of olfactory sensory neurons.

Production of and responses to schreckstoff change over the course of ontogeny. For example, young brook sticklebacks (Culaea inconstans) are more likely to be caught in minnow traps that have been baited with conspecific skin extracts than adults. This result indicates young brook sticklebacks do not make the association between schreckstoff and the potential presence of a predator as readily as adults. Whether this association strengthens over time as a result of learning or physiological development remains unclear.

In addition to changes across ontogeny, the degree to which schreckstoff is produced varies within the breeding season. Male fathead minnows (Pimephales promelas) cease production of schreckstoff during the breeding season, but still exhibit antipredator behaviors in response to schreckstoff during this time. Schreckstoff production may be halted at this time because male fathead minnows often incur mechanical damage while building their nests. It would be detrimental to a male to produce schreckstoff while building a nest, as it would inadvertently repel females, thereby decreasing the likelihood of obtaining a mate. By ceasing schreckstoff production during the breeding season, males circumvent this problem. The cessation of alarm substance cell production appears to be controlled by androgens.

== Hypotheses for the evolution of schreckstoff ==
A number of different hypotheses have been proposed for the evolution of schreckstoff. The first hypothesis is that the evolution of schreckstoff has been driven by kin selection. Support for this hypothesis would include evidence that individuals live in groups of closely related kin and that the release of chemical alarm signals increases the likelihood that related individuals will avoid predation. The second hypothesis, predator attraction, suggests the release of schreckstoff may attract additional predators which will interfere with the predation event, increasing the likelihood that the prey will escape and survive the attack. This hypothesis assumes predators will be attracted to schreckstoff and will interfere with one another either through competition for the captured prey or through predation of one another. It additionally assumes, despite the fact that the prey has already incurred mechanical damage, it is possible for the prey to escape and recover from the attack. Testing and validating these assumptions would provide support for the predator attraction hypothesis. The third hypothesis proposes that schreckstoff has an immune function, providing protection against pathogens, parasites and/or UVB radiation. For this hypothesis to be supported, a correlation between alarm substance cell production and the presence of pathogens and parasites would need to be observed. Direct evidence that schreckstoff inhibits the growth of aquatic pathogens and parasites would provide additional support for the immunity hypothesis. Another hypothesis is that schreckstoff is a breakdown product of mucus and club cells, induced by injury. Selection for the alarm response is primarily at the level of the receiver.

=== Kin selection hypothesis ===
One of the first hypotheses for the evolution of schreckstoff centered on W.D. Hamilton’s theory of kin selection. Under the theory of kin selection, the sender of the chemical alarm signal would be willing to incur the costs of sending this signal if the benefits to related individuals were sufficiently high. In a situation where the sender of the signal is paying great costs (i.e., it releases the chemical alarm signal because it has incurred potentially mortal mechanical damage), the benefits to closely related kin would have to be great. Under the framework of kin selection, behaviors that are seemingly detrimental to the sender are selected because they benefit individuals that are likely to share alleles by common descent. In this way, the frequency of the sender's alleles in the next generation is increased by their presence in successful kin.

To apply kin selection theory to the evolution of schreckstoff, a number of conditions must be met. First, evidence must exist for the release of schreckstoff by the sender confers benefiting the receivers. Second, it must be shown that individuals in the order Ostariophysi associate mainly with family members. If either of these two assumptions is violated, then the kin selection hypothesis would not be supported.

Some evidence exists in support of the first assumption that the release of schreckstoff confers quantifiable advantages to the receivers of this chemical signal. A laboratory experiment revealed that fathead minnows exposed to conspecific schreckstoff survived 39.5% longer than controls when placed in a tank with a predatory northern pike (Esox lucius). This finding suggests schreckstoff increases vigilance in receivers, resulting in a quicker reaction time following detection of the predator.

The second assumption, that individuals in the order Ostariophysi generally associate with close family members, does not appear to be supported by empirical evidence. In shoals of European minnows (Phoxinus phoxinus), no difference in relatedness was found within and between shoals, indicating individuals are not associating more closely with relatives than nonrelatives. Shoal composition has not been examined in all members of the ostariophysan order, and shoals composed entirely of family members may yet be discovered. Nevertheless, the finding that schreckstoff production is maintained in a species where the function is clearly unrelated to kin benefits provides strong evidence against kin selection as a mechanism for the evolution of schreckstoff.

Fathead minnows have also been found to produce fewer epidermal alarm substance cells (and therefore less schreckstoff) when in the presence of familiar shoalmates. The results of this study indicate one of two scenarios, neither of which is compatible with the hypothesis that schreckstoff evolved by kin selection. First, if schreckstoff evolved by kin selection, more epidermal alarm substance cells would be expected to be produced in the presence of kin than nonkin. This means familiar shoalmates in fathead minnows should be closely related kin and schreckstoff production should be increased when in shoals with familiar individuals. The study did not find this to be the case. Second, these results indicate individuals either do not associate with kin at all or production of schreckstoff varies depending on how familiar the focal fish is with the individuals with which it shoals. In conclusion, evidence does not support the hypothesis that schreckstoff evolved because it bolstered the inclusive fitness of the sender through increased survival of kin.

=== Predator attractant hypothesis ===
The predator attractant hypothesis proposes that the main purpose of schreckstoff is to attract additional predators to the area. According to this hypothesis, additional predators will interact with the initial predator, and these interactions will provide the sender with an opportunity to escape. A number of conditions must be met to support this hypothesis. First, schreckstoff must attract predators. Second, subsequent predators must disrupt the predation event, thereby increasing the probability that the prey will escape. Third, the sender must be able to recover from the mechanical damage incurred during the predation event.

A 1995 study provides support for the first condition that the release of schreckstoff must attract predators. This experiment revealed that schreckstoff extracted from the skin of fathead minnows attracted both northern pike (Esox lucius) and Colymbetes sculptilis predatory diving beetles. Additionally, a natural study showed that predatory fish were seven times more likely to strike a lure baited with a sponge soaked in fathead minnow skin extract than a sponge soaked in either water or skin extract from a nonostariophysan convict cichlid (which presumably does not produce schreckstoff).

While the previous two studies provided examples of systems in which schreckstoff acts to attract additional predators, a system was found for which this was not the case. Spotted bass (Micropterus punctulatus) were exposed to skin (containing schreckstoff) and muscle (control, containing no schreckstoff) extracts from five different co-occurring prey species. The spotted bass were not attracted to any of the schreckstoff treatments. This result indicates schreckstoff does not always attract relevant predators in the area. Cashner also pointed out regarding the 1995 study that northern pike are an introduced species in much of the fathead minnow's range, so were not likely to be coevolving with these minnows during the evolution of the schreckstoff system. This system may be more ecologically relevant and little evidence suggests schreckstoff evolved as a predator attractant. In conclusion, the debate continues over whether or not the first condition for this hypothesis has been met.

The second condition that needs to be met in support of the predator attraction hypothesis is that additional predators must occasionally disrupt predation events, increasing the probability that prey will escape. In the northern pike/fathead minnow system, additional northern pike may interfere with a predation event in one of two ways. First, additional northern pike of the same size interfere with a predation event by coming into contact with the main predator (biting it, etc.). Second, additional pike of larger size attracted to schreckstoff may prey on the initial predator.

The probability that fathead minnows escape after being captured by a northern pike significantly increases when a second pike interferes with the predation event. The northern pike have an age-structured population biased towards younger, smaller individuals. If a younger pike attacks a fathead minnow and attracts an older, larger conspecific, then the younger pike may be at risk of cannibalism and will be inclined to release the prey to focus on escape. In regards to the second condition, additional predators do appear to disrupt predation events, increasing the probability that the sender will escape. The final condition, that individuals need to successfully recover from a predation event, appears to be satisfied. Support for this condition comes from the observation that many small fishes in natural populations exhibit scars, presumably from failed predator attempts.

While the evidence that schreckstoff attracts predators is mixed, studies indicate multiple predators will interfere with each other and prey can recover from predation events when they manage to escape. The extent to which predators are attracted to a predation event depends upon the speed at which schreckstoff diffuses through its aquatic environment, which in turn depends upon water flow parameters. This hypothesis indicates schreckstoff evolved as a way of increasing the probability of survival during a predation event and its role as a predator cue for conspecifics evolved subsequently. Supported by more empirical studies than the kin selection hypothesis, the predator attraction hypothesis remained popular for quite some time.

=== Schreckstoff as a possible defense against pathogens, parasites and UVB radiation ===
The final hypothesis posits that schreckstoff has an immune function and may be the first line of defense against pathogens, parasites, and/or UVB radiation. Evidence for this hypothesis is strong. A recent comprehensive study revealed that exposure to parasites and pathogens that penetrate the skin of ostariophysans stimulated the production of alarm cells. Additionally, increased exposure to UV radiation was correlated with an increase in alarm cell production.

The role of schreckstoff in immune response was further strengthened by the finding that skin extracts from fathead minnows inhibited the growth of Saprolegnia ferax (a water mould) in culture. In contrast, skin extracts from swordtails (Xiphophorus helleri), which are not believed to produce schreckstoff, increased S. ferax growth compared to controls. Cadmium, a heavy metal and an immunosuppressant in vertebrates, inhibits the production of alarm cells when fishes are infected with Saprolegnia. Furthermore, a follow-up study treated fathead minnows with cortisol, a well-known immunosuppressant, which significantly reduced alarm cell investment in conjunction with leukocyte activity. The results of these extensive studies strongly suggest schreckstoff's main function is to provide immunity against a number of environmental threats aimed at the fish's epidermis.

If schreckstoff evolved as a defense against pathogens, parasites, and UVB radiation, then the release of schreckstoff into the environment subsequently allowed for both predators and prey to exploit this system. Predators in some systems may use schreckstoff as a cue for an easy meal, either by disrupting the predation event to steal the prey item for themselves or by preying on the initial predator. Nearby conspecifics then exploit schreckstoff as a chemical cue, alerting them to the presence of a predator in the area.

== Ecological considerations ==
The most convincing research to date indicates alarm substance cells serve as an immune system response and the ecological ramifications of this substance as a chemical alarm signal developed subsequently. This finding generates a number of interesting research questions. First, as mentioned earlier, males in many ostariophysan species cease production of alarm substance cells during the breeding season, presumably so females are not inadvertently repelled from the nest when males incur mechanical damage during nest building. In light of the immune hypothesis, alarm substance cells possibly are instead produced less during the breeding season because increased testosterone levels may decrease immune responses. Additionally, this finding indicates males are at a greater risk from UVB radiation, as well as parasite and pathogen infection, during the breeding season.

The role of schreckstoff as an immune response has additional implications in this age of increasing environmental change. Environmental stressors, including UVB radiation, pollution, and parasites, are increasing in the environment, and are likely to continue increasing over time. UVB radiation exposure is increasing due to decreases in stratospheric ozone, diseases are becoming increasingly important at both local and global scales, and pollutants, including heavy metals, are being introduced into ecosystems. If cadmium, the heavy metal affecting the fish's ability to produce schreckstoff in response to environmental stressors, increased in concentration in the environment, the immune response of many ostariophysan fishes would be compromised.

== Sources ==
- Argentini, M. 1976. Isolierung des Schreckstoffes aus der Haut der Elritze Phoxinus phoxinus (L). University of Zurich.
- Atema, J., and D. Stenzler. 1977. Alarm substance of the marine mud snail, Nassarius obsoletus: Biological characterization and possible evolution. Journal of Chemical Ecology 3:173-187.
- Blaustein, A. R., J. M. Kiesecker, D. P. Chivers, and R. G. Anthony. 1997. Ambient UV-B radiation causes deformities in amphibian embryos. Proceedings of the National Academy of Sciences in the USA 94:13735-13737.
- Brown, G. E., J. C. J. Adrian, E. Smyth, H. Leet, and S. Brennan. 2000. Ostariophysan alarm pheromones: laboratory and field tests of the functional significance of nitrogen oxides. Journal of Chemical Ecology 26:139-154.
- Chivers, D. P., G. E. Brown, and R. J. F. Smith. 1996. The evolution of chemical alarm signals: Attracting predators benefits alarm signal senders. The American Naturalist 148:649-659.
- Chivers, D. P., and R. J. F. Smith. 1994. Intra- and interspecific avoidance of areas marked with skin extract from brook sticklebacks (Culea inconstans) in a natural habitat. Journal of Chemical Ecology 20:1517-1523.
- Chivers, D. P., B. D. Wisenden, C. J. Hindman, T. A. Michalak, R. C. Kusch, S. G. W. Kaminskyj, K. L. Lack, M. C. O. Ferrari, *R. J. Pollock, C. F. Halbgewachs, M. S. Pollock, S. Alemadi, C. T. James, R. K. Savaloja, C. P. Goater, A. Corwin, R. S. Mirza, J. M. Kiesecker, G. E. Brown, J. C. J. Adrian, P. H. Krone, A. R. Blaustein, and A. Mathis. 2007. Epidermal 'alarm substance' cells of fishes maintained by non-alarm functions: possible defense against pathogens, parasites and UVB radiation. Proceedings of the Royal Society B 274:2611-2619.
- Fässler, S. M. M., and M. J. Kaiser. 2008. Phylogenetically mediated anti-predator responses in bivalve molluscs. Marine Ecology Progress Series 363:217-225.
- Folstad, I., and Karter, A.J. 1992. Parasites, bright males, and the immunocompetence handicap. The American Naturalist 139: 603-622.
- Frisch, K. v. 1938. Zur psychologie des Fische-Schwarmes. Naturwissenschaften 26:601-606.
- Halbgewachs, C. F., R. C. Kusch, T. A. Marchant and D. P. Chivers. 2009. Epidermal club cells and the innate immune system of minnows. Proceedings of the Royal Society B 98:891-897.
- Hamilton, W. G. 1963. The evolution of altruistic behavior. American Naturalist 97:354-356.
- Hamilton, W. G. 1964a. The genetical evolution of social behavior. I. Journal of Theoretical Biology 7:1-16.
- Hamilton, W. G. 1964b. The genetical evolution of social behaviour. II. Journal of Theoretical Biology 7.
- Hews, D. K. 1988. Alarm response in larval western toads, Bufo boreas: release of larval chemicals by a natural predator and its effect on predator capture efficiency. Animal Behaviour 36:125-133.
- Hews, D. K., and A. R. Blaustein. 1985. An investigation of the alarm response in Bufo boreas and Rana cascadae tadpoles. Behavioral and Neural Biology 43:47-57.
- Jensen, A., and F. Bro-Rasmussen. 1992. Environmental cadmium in Europe. Reviews of Environmental Contamination and Toxicology 125:101-108.
- Kiesecker, J. M., L. K. Belden, K. Shea, and M. J. Rubbo. 2004. Amphibian decline and emerging diseases. American Scientist 92:138-147.
- Lutterschmidt, W. I., G. A. Marvin, and V. H. Hutchison. 1994. Alarm response by a plethodontid salamander (Desmognathus ochraphaeus): conspecific and heterospecific "schreckstoff". Journal of Chemical Ecology 20:2751-2757.
- Mathis, A., and R. J. F. Smith. 1993. Chemical alarm signals increase the survival time of fathead minnows (Pimephales promelas) during encounters with northern pike (Esox lucius). Behavioral Ecology 4:260-265.
- Mathis, A., and R. J. F. Smith. 1994. Intraspecific and cross-superorder responses to chemical alarm signals by brook stickleback. Ecology 74:2395-2404.
- Mathuru, A., Kibat, C., Cheong, W. F., Shui, G., Wenk, M. R., Friedrich, R. W. and Jesuthasan, S. 2012. Chondroitin fragments are odorants that trigger fear behavior in fish. Current Biology 22: 538-544.
- Naish, K.-A., G. R. Carvalho, and T. J. Pitcher. 1993. The genetic structure and microdistribution of shoals of Phoxinus phoxinus, the European Minnow. Journal of Fish Biology 43:75-89.
- Nelson, J. S. 1994. Fishes of the world, 4th edition. Wiley-Interscience, New York, NY.
- Pfeiffer, W. 1982. Chemical signals in communication. Pages 307-325 in T. J. In Hara, editor. Chemoreception in fishes. Elsevier, Amsterdam.
- Sanchez-Dardon, J., I. Voccia, A. Hontela, S. Chilmonczyk, M. Dunier, H. Boermans, B. Blakley, and M. Fournier. 1999. Immunomodulation by heavy metals tested individually or in mixtures in rainbow trout (Oncorhynchus mykiss) exposed in vivo. Environmental Toxicology and Chemistry 18:1492-1497.
- Smith, R. J. F. 1973. Testosterone eliminates alarm substance in male fathead minnows. Canadian Journal of Zoology 54:875-876.
- Smith, R. J. F. 1992. Alarm signals in fishes. Reviews in Fish Biology and Fisheries 2:33-63.
- Smith, R. J. F., and A. D. Lemly. 1986. Survival of fathead minnows after injury by predators and its possible role in the evolution of alarm signals. Environmental Biology of Fishes 15:147-149.
- Snyder, N. F. R., and H. A. Snyder. 1970. Alarm response of Diadema antillarum. Science 168:276-278.
- Stenzler, D., and J. Atema. 1977. Alarm response of the marine mud snail, Nassarius obsoletus: Specificity and behavioral priority. Journal of Chemical Ecology 3:159-171.
- Wisenden, B. D., and R. J. F. Smith. 1998. A re-evaluation of the effect of shoalmate familiarity on the proliferation of alarm substance cells in ostariophysan fishes. Journal of Fish Biology 53:841-846.
- Wisenden, B. D., and T. A. Thiel. 2002. Field verification of predator attraction to minnow alarm substance. Journal of Chemical Ecology 28:433-438.
