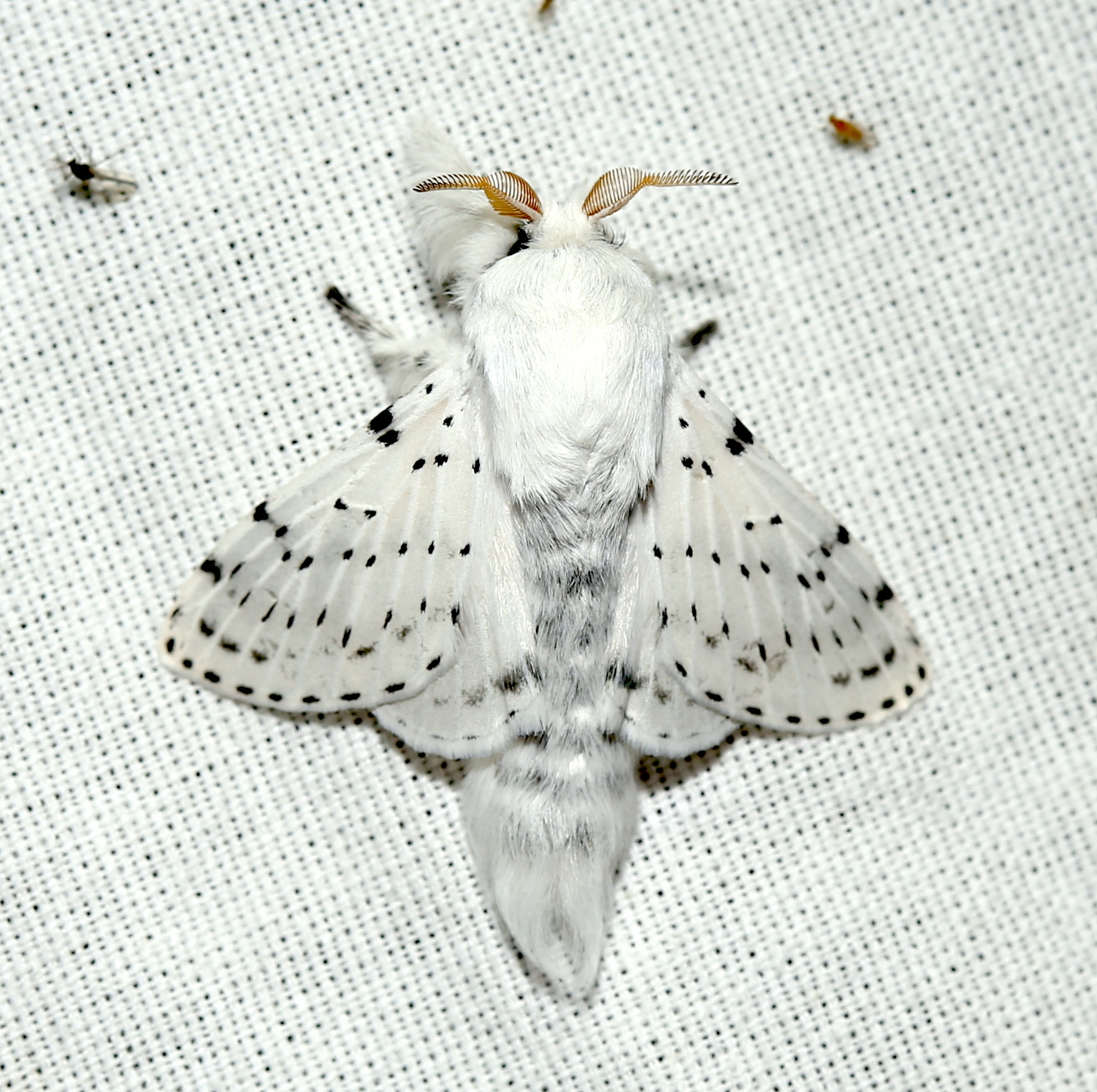

Scientific classification
- Kingdom: Animalia
- Phylum: Arthropoda
- Clade: Pancrustacea
- Class: Insecta
- Order: Lepidoptera
- Family: Lasiocampidae
- Genus: Artace
- Species: A. cribrarius

Binomial name
- Artace cribrarius (Ljungh, 1825)

Synonyms
- Cossus cribrarius Ljungh, 1825; Artace punctistriga Walker, 1855; Artace cribraria (Ljungh, 1825)

= Artace cribrarius =

Species of moth

Artace cribrarius, the dot-lined white, is a species of moth in the family Lasiocampidae. It was first described by Sven Ingemar Ljungh in 1825.
