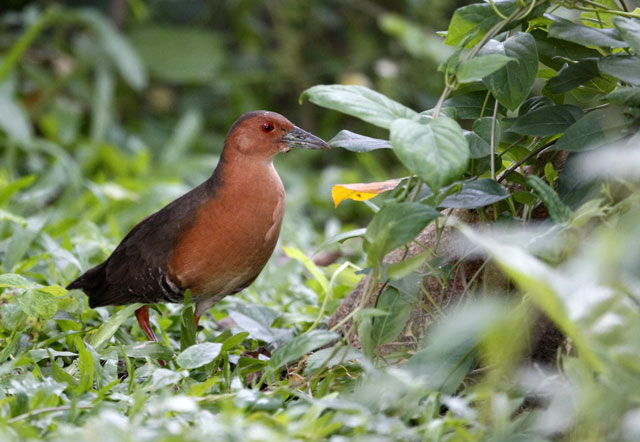

Conservation status
- Near Threatened (IUCN 3.1)

Scientific classification
- Kingdom: Animalia
- Phylum: Chordata
- Class: Aves
- Order: Gruiformes
- Family: Rallidae
- Genus: Zapornia
- Species: Z. paykullii

Binomial name
- Zapornia paykullii (Ljungh, 1813)

Synonyms
- Porzana paykullii

= Band-bellied crake =

Species of bird

The band-bellied crake (Zapornia paykullii) is a species of bird in the family Rallidae. It breeds in Manchuria, eastern China and northern Korea; it winters throughout Southeast Asia.

It is getting rare due to habitat loss.

In 1813 the Swedish taxon author Sven Ingemar Ljungh named the bird after the naturalist Gustaf von Paykull.
