= Habroloma nanum =

Scientific classification
- Kingdom: Animalia
- Phylum: Arthropoda
- Clade: Pancrustacea
- Class: Insecta
- Order: Coleoptera
- Suborder: Polyphaga
- Infraorder: Elateriformia
- Family: Buprestidae
- Genus: Habroloma
- Species: H. nanum

Binomial name
- Habroloma nanum (Paykull, 1799)

Species of beetle

Habroloma nanum is a species of beetles belonging to the family Buprestidae.

It is native to Europe.

Synonyms:

- Habroloma nana (alternative combination)
- Habroloma geranii (Silfverberg, 1977)
