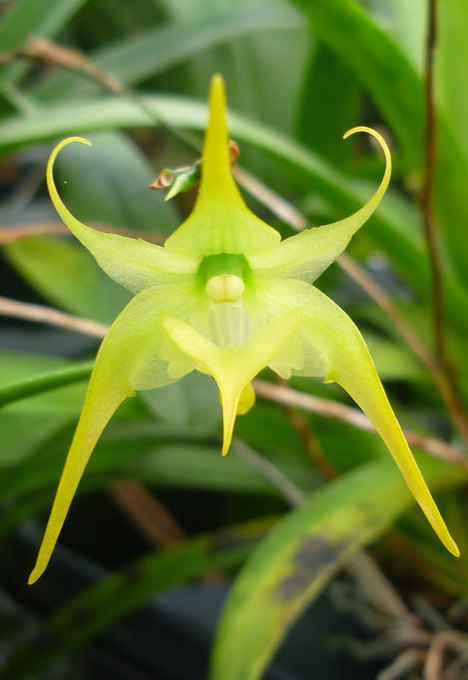
- Detail of Aeranthes arachnites flower

Scientific classification
- Kingdom: Plantae
- Clade: Tracheophytes
- Clade: Angiosperms
- Clade: Monocots
- Order: Asparagales
- Family: Orchidaceae
- Subfamily: Epidendroideae
- Tribe: Vandeae
- Subtribe: Angraecinae
- Genus: Aeranthes; Lindl.

Type species
- Aeranthes grandiflora Lindl.

Species
- Aeranthes adenopoda; Aeranthes aemula; Aeranthes africana; Aeranthes albidiflora; Aeranthes ambrensis; Aeranthes angustidens; Aeranthes antennophora; Aeranthes arachnites; Aeranthes bathieana; Aeranthes biauriculata; Aeranthes brevivaginans; Aeranthes carnosa; Aeranthes caudata; Aeranthes crassifolia; Aeranthes denticulata; Aeranthes ecalcarata; Aeranthes erectiflora; Aeranthes filiformis; Aeranthes filipes; Aeranthes gracilis; Aeranthes grandiflora; Aeranthes gravenreuthii; Aeranthes henricii; Aeranthes imerinensis; Aeranthes laxiflora; Aeranthes leandriana; Aeranthes longipes; Aeranthes moratii; Aeranthes multinodis; Aeranthes neoperrieri; Aeranthes nidus; Aeranthes orophila; Aeranthes orthopoda; Aeranthes parkesii; Aeranthes parvula; Aeranthes perrieri; Aeranthes peyrotii; Aeranthes pseudonidus; Aeranthes pusilla; Aeranthes ramosa; Aeranthes rigidula; Aeranthes robusta; Aeranthes sambiranoensis; Aeranthes schlechteri; Aeranthes setipes; Aeranthes tenella; Aeranthes tenella var. borbonica; Aeranthes tricalcarata; Aeranthes tropophila

Synonyms
- Aeranthus Lindl. ex Spreng., orth. var.

= Aeranthes =

Genus of orchids

Aeranthes, abbreviated Aerth in the horticultural trade, is an orchid genus with 47 species, mostly from shady, tropical humid forests in Zimbabwe, Madagascar and islands in the Western Indian Ocean. The name "aeranthes" means 'aerial flower', as their flowers appear to be suspended in the air.

== Description ==
Aeranthes has a single short, erect, monopodial stem. The leathery, shining, opposite leaves are arranged in two rows of five to seven leaves, with a length of 15–25 cm. New leaves are formed at the top of the stem in a monopodial growth pattern.

The threadlike flower stalk grows downward to a length of almost 30 cm. It carries one or two almost translucent, greenish yellow flowers. The sepals and the shorter petals taper off into five long, narrow shoots. Some give an agreeable, sweet scent in the evening or early morning.
