= Colymbetes dolabratus =

Scientific classification
- Kingdom: Animalia
- Phylum: Arthropoda
- Clade: Pancrustacea
- Class: Insecta
- Order: Coleoptera
- Suborder: Adephaga
- Family: Dytiscidae
- Genus: Colymbetes
- Species: C. dolabratus

Binomial name
- Colymbetes dolabratus (Paykull, 1798)

Synonyms
- Colymbetes tolli Zaitzev, 1907

Species of beetle

Colymbetes dolabratus is a species of predaceous diving beetle in the family Dytiscidae. It is found in North America and the Palearctic.
