= Aeranthes ecalcarata =

Conservation status
- Least Concern (IUCN 3.1)

Scientific classification
- Kingdom: Plantae
- Clade: Tracheophytes
- Clade: Angiosperms
- Clade: Monocots
- Order: Asparagales
- Family: Orchidaceae
- Subfamily: Epidendroideae
- Genus: Aeranthes
- Species: A. ecalcarata

Binomial name
- Aeranthes ecalcarata H.Perrier, 1938

Species of orchid

Aeranthes ecalcarata is a species of orchid native to Madagascar. It is found at elevations of 1,200 to 1,524 meters in humid evergreen forests.
