= Aeranthes carnosa =

Conservation status
- Data Deficient (IUCN 3.1)

Scientific classification
- Kingdom: Plantae
- Clade: Tracheophytes
- Clade: Angiosperms
- Clade: Monocots
- Order: Asparagales
- Family: Orchidaceae
- Subfamily: Epidendroideae
- Genus: Aeranthes
- Species: A. carnosa

Binomial name
- Aeranthes carnosa Toill.-Gen., Ursch & Bosser

Species of orchid

Aeranthes carnosa is a species of orchid native to the east coast of Madagascar.
