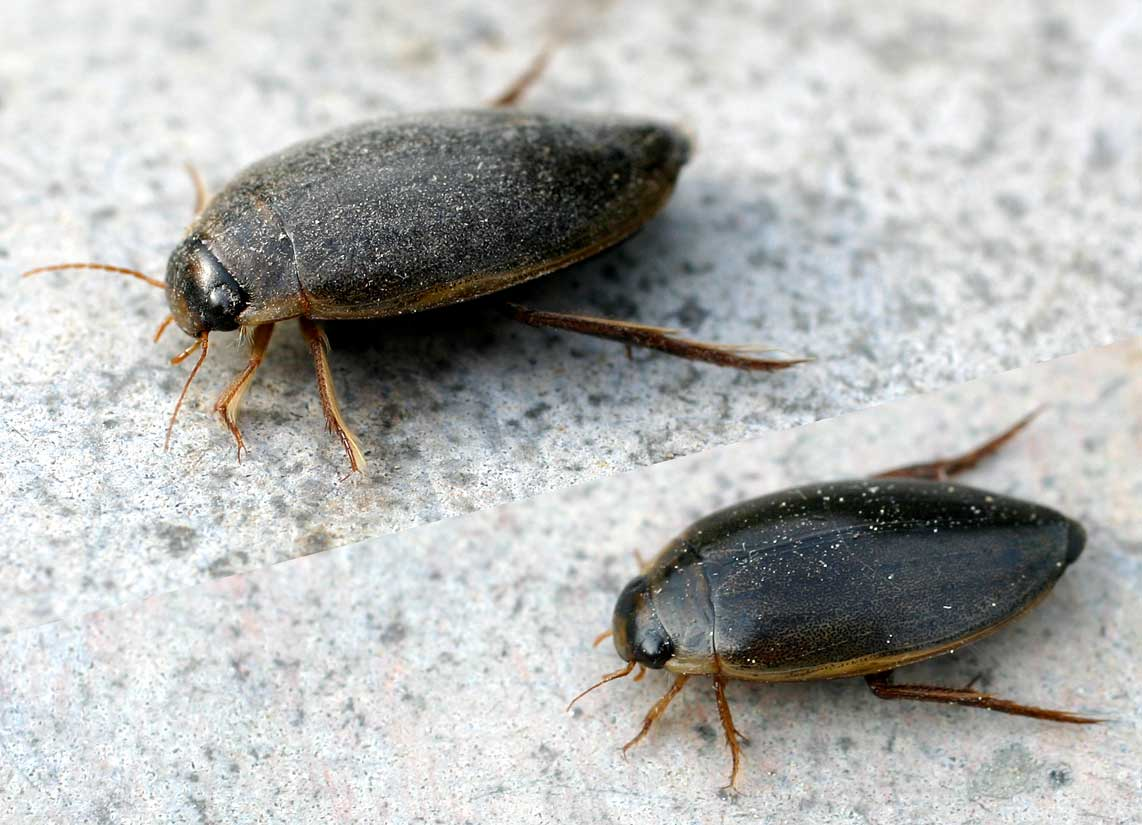
- Colymbetes fuscus

Scientific classification
- Domain: Eukaryota
- Kingdom: Animalia
- Phylum: Arthropoda
- Class: Insecta
- Order: Coleoptera
- Suborder: Adephaga
- Family: Dytiscidae
- Subfamily: Colymbetinae
- Tribe: Colymbetini
- Genus: Colymbetes; Clairville, 1806

Synonyms
- Cymatopterus Dejean, 1833

= Colymbetes =

Genus of beetles

Colymbetes is a genus of beetles native to the Palearctic, including Europe, the Nearctic, the Near East and North Africa.

It contains the following species:

- Colymbetes aemulus Heer, 1862
- Colymbetes dahuricus Aubé, 1837
- Colymbetes densus LeConte, 1859
- Colymbetes dolabratus (Paykull, 1798)
- Colymbetes exaratus LeConte, 1862
- Colymbetes fuscus (Linnaeus, 1758)
- Colymbetes incognitus Zimmerman, 1981
- Colymbetes koenigi Zaitzev, 1927
- Colymbetes magnus Feng, 1936
- Colymbetes mesepotamicus Abdul-Karim & Ali, 1986
- Colymbetes minimus Zaitzev, 1908
- Colymbetes miocaenicus Riha, 1974
- Colymbetes paykulli Erichson, 1837
- Colymbetes piceus Klug, 1834
- Colymbetes pseudostriatus Nilsson, 2002
- Colymbetes schildknechti Dettner, 1983
- Colymbetes sculptilis Harris, 1829
- Colymbetes semenowi (Jakovlev, 1896)
- Colymbetes striatus (Linnaeus, 1758)
- Colymbetes strigatus LeConte, 1852
- Colymbetes substrigatus Sharp, 1882
- Colymbetes tschitscherini (Jakovlev, 1896)
- Colymbetes vagans Sharp, 1882

Names brought to synonymy

- Colymbetes elegans or Colymbetes multistriatus, synonyms for Copelatus posticatus
