= Colymbetes dahuricus =

Scientific classification
- Domain: Eukaryota
- Kingdom: Animalia
- Phylum: Arthropoda
- Class: Insecta
- Order: Coleoptera
- Suborder: Adephaga
- Family: Dytiscidae
- Genus: Colymbetes
- Species: C. dahuricus

Binomial name
- Colymbetes dahuricus Aubé, 1837

Synonyms
- Colymbetes seminiger LeConte, 1862

Species of beetle

Colymbetes dahuricus is a species of predaceous diving beetle in the family Dytiscidae. It is found in North America and the Palearctic.
