= Colymbetes exaratus =

Scientific classification
- Domain: Eukaryota
- Kingdom: Animalia
- Phylum: Arthropoda
- Class: Insecta
- Order: Coleoptera
- Suborder: Adephaga
- Family: Dytiscidae
- Genus: Colymbetes
- Species: C. exaratus

Binomial name
- Colymbetes exaratus Leconte, 1862

Synonyms
- Colymbetes rugipennis Sharp, 1882

Species of beetle

Colymbetes exaratus is a species of predaceous diving beetle in the family Dytiscidae. It is found in North America.

== Subspecies ==
These two subspecies belong to the species Colymbetes exaratus:

- Colymbetes exaratus exaratus
- Colymbetes exaratus incognitus Zimmerman
