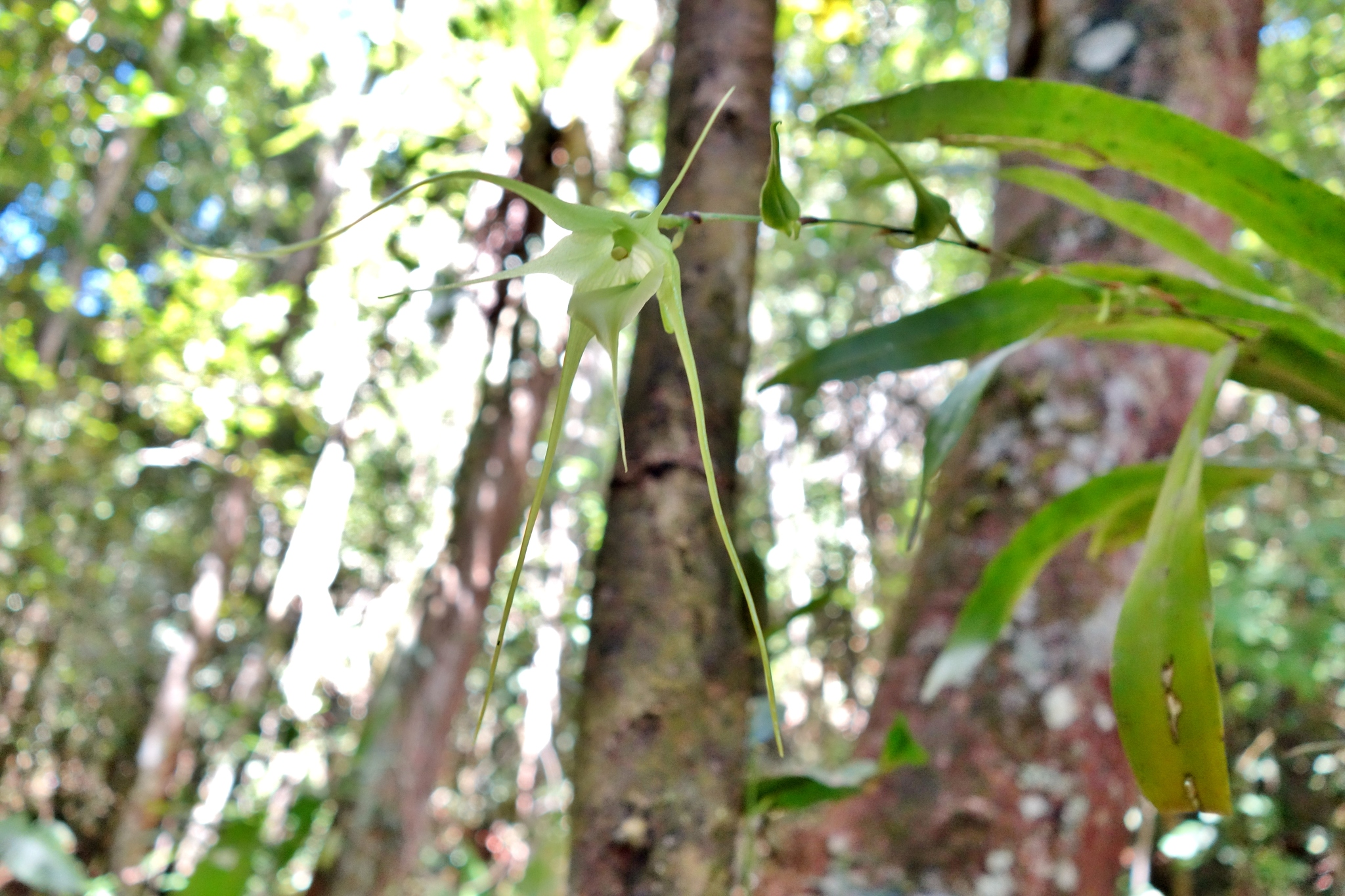

Conservation status
- Endangered (IUCN 3.1)

Scientific classification
- Kingdom: Plantae
- Clade: Tracheophytes
- Clade: Angiosperms
- Clade: Monocots
- Order: Asparagales
- Family: Orchidaceae
- Subfamily: Epidendroideae
- Genus: Aeranthes
- Species: A. antennophora

Binomial name
- Aeranthes antennophora H.Perrier, 1938

= Aeranthes antennophora =

Species of orchid

Aeranthes antennophora is a species of orchid native to Madagascar.
