= Colymbetes incognitus =

Scientific classification
- Domain: Eukaryota
- Kingdom: Animalia
- Phylum: Arthropoda
- Class: Insecta
- Order: Coleoptera
- Suborder: Adephaga
- Family: Dytiscidae
- Genus: Colymbetes
- Species: C. incognitus

Binomial name
- Colymbetes incognitus Zimmerman, 1981

Species of beetle

Colymbetes incognitus is a species of predaceous diving beetle in the family Dytiscidae. It is found in North America.
