= Gustaf von Paykull =

Swedish scientist (1757–1826)

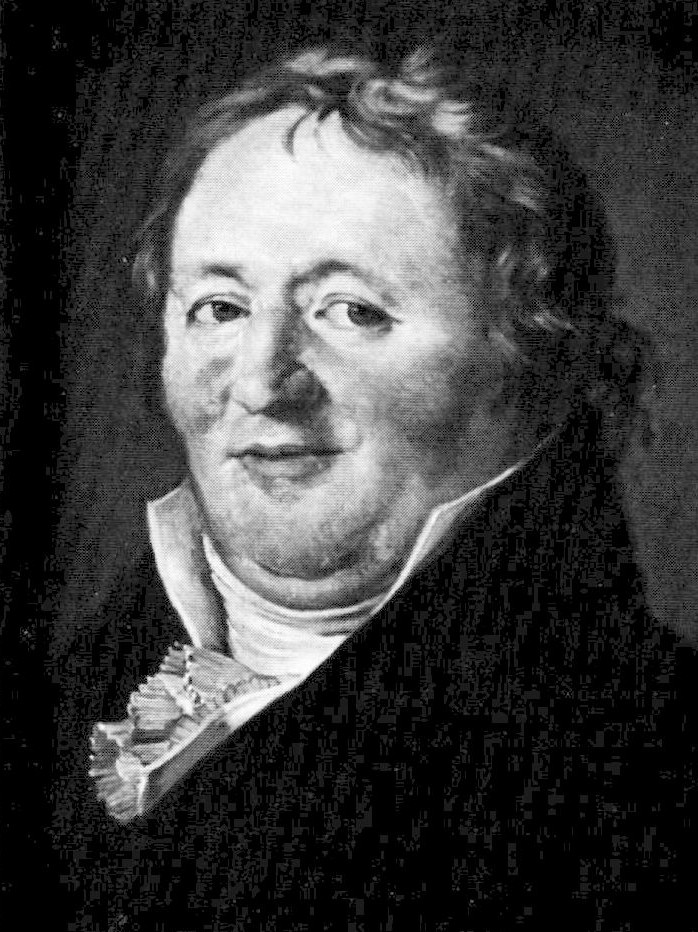
- Born: 23 July 1757; Stockholm County, Sweden
- Died: 28 January 1826 (aged 68); Uppsala County, Sweden

Gustav von Paykull (23 July 1757 – 28 January 1826) was a Swedish friherre (circa baron) and Marshal of the Court, ornithologist, and entomologist.

He was a member of the Royal Swedish Academy from 1791 and a founder of the natural history museum (Naturhistoriska Riksmuseet) in Stockholm, through his 1819 donation of his extensive zoological collections to the academy (now in the Swedish Museum of Natural History). He was elected a member of the American Philosophical Society in 1801 and a Foreign Honorary Member of the American Academy of Arts and Sciences in 1804.

== Publications ==
His best-known publications are:

- Monographia Histeroidum. Upsaliae : Palmblad iv 114 pp. (1811).
- Fauna Suecica. Insecta, Coleoptera. Upsala : Edman 3 volumes. (3 volumes, 1798, 1799, 1800)

== Species named in his honor ==
- The red false black widow spider, Steatoda paykulliana
- The pantropical jumping spider, Plexippus paykulli
- The band-bellied crake, Porzana paykullii
- Scolopax paykullii, probably the red breasted snipe, or short-billed dowitcher, now known as Scolopax grisea
- Tortrix paykulliana – synonym of Epinotia ramella
- Alucita paykullella – synonym of Micropterix paykullella
- Amarygmus paykulii – Tenebrionine beetle
- Colymbetes paykulli – Dytiscid beetle
