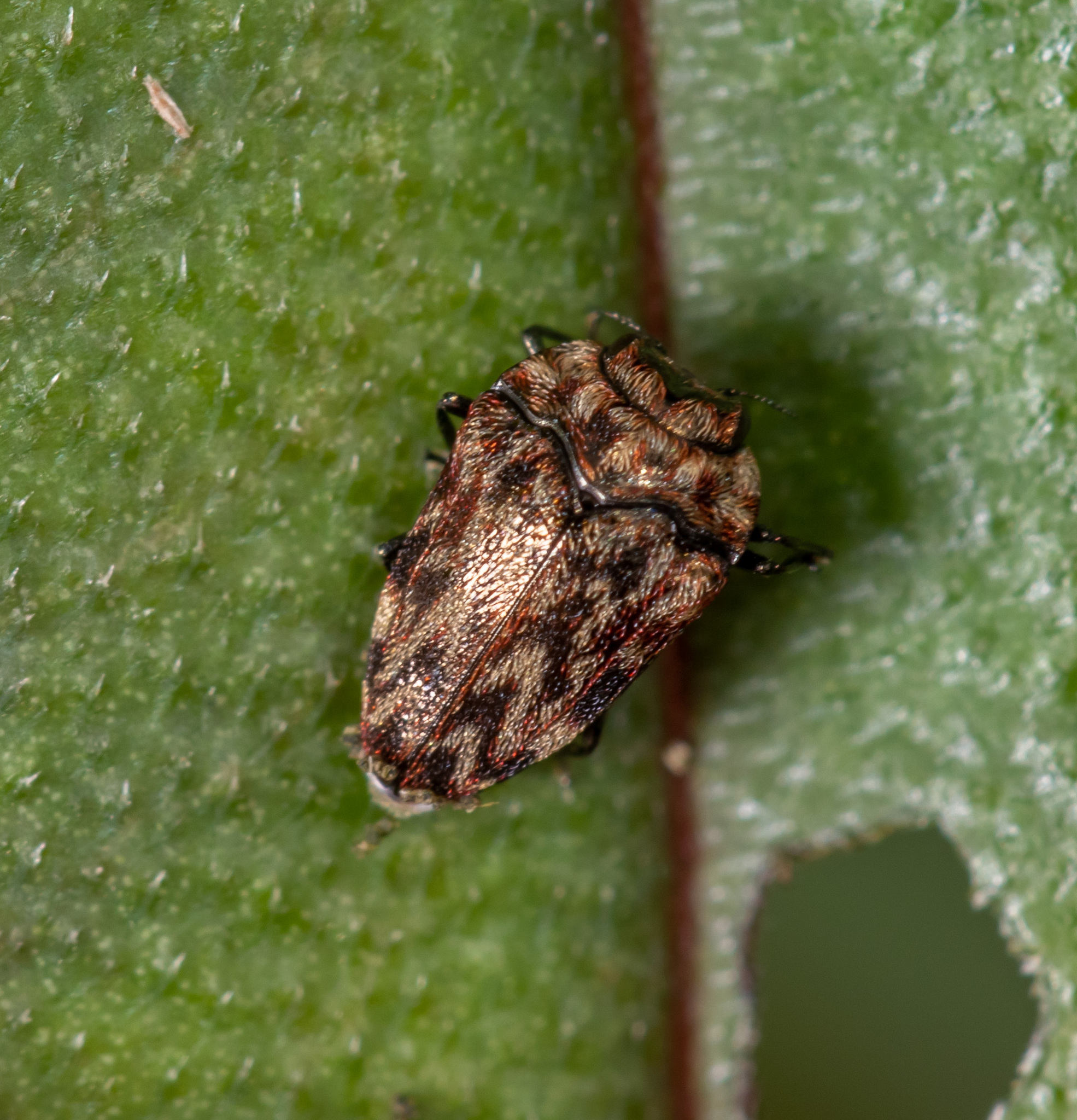
- Habroloma lepidopterum, Indonesia

Scientific classification
- Domain: Eukaryota
- Kingdom: Animalia
- Phylum: Arthropoda
- Class: Insecta
- Order: Coleoptera
- Suborder: Polyphaga
- Infraorder: Elateriformia
- Family: Buprestidae
- Genus: Habroloma; Thomson, 1864

Synonyms
- Malobroha Cobos, 1979; Parahabroloma Kurosawa, 1962

= Habroloma =

Genus of beetles

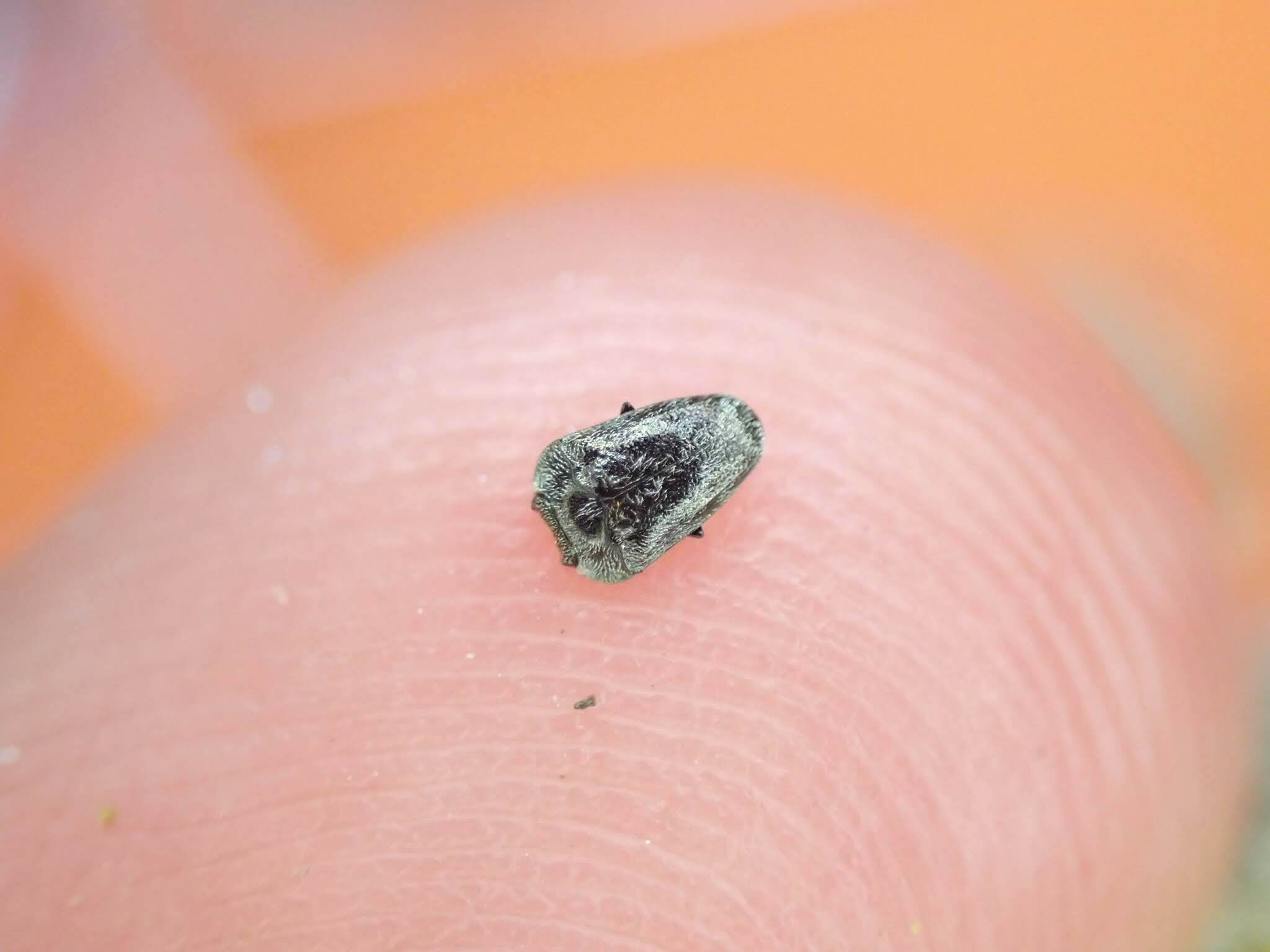
Habroloma griseonigrum, Japan

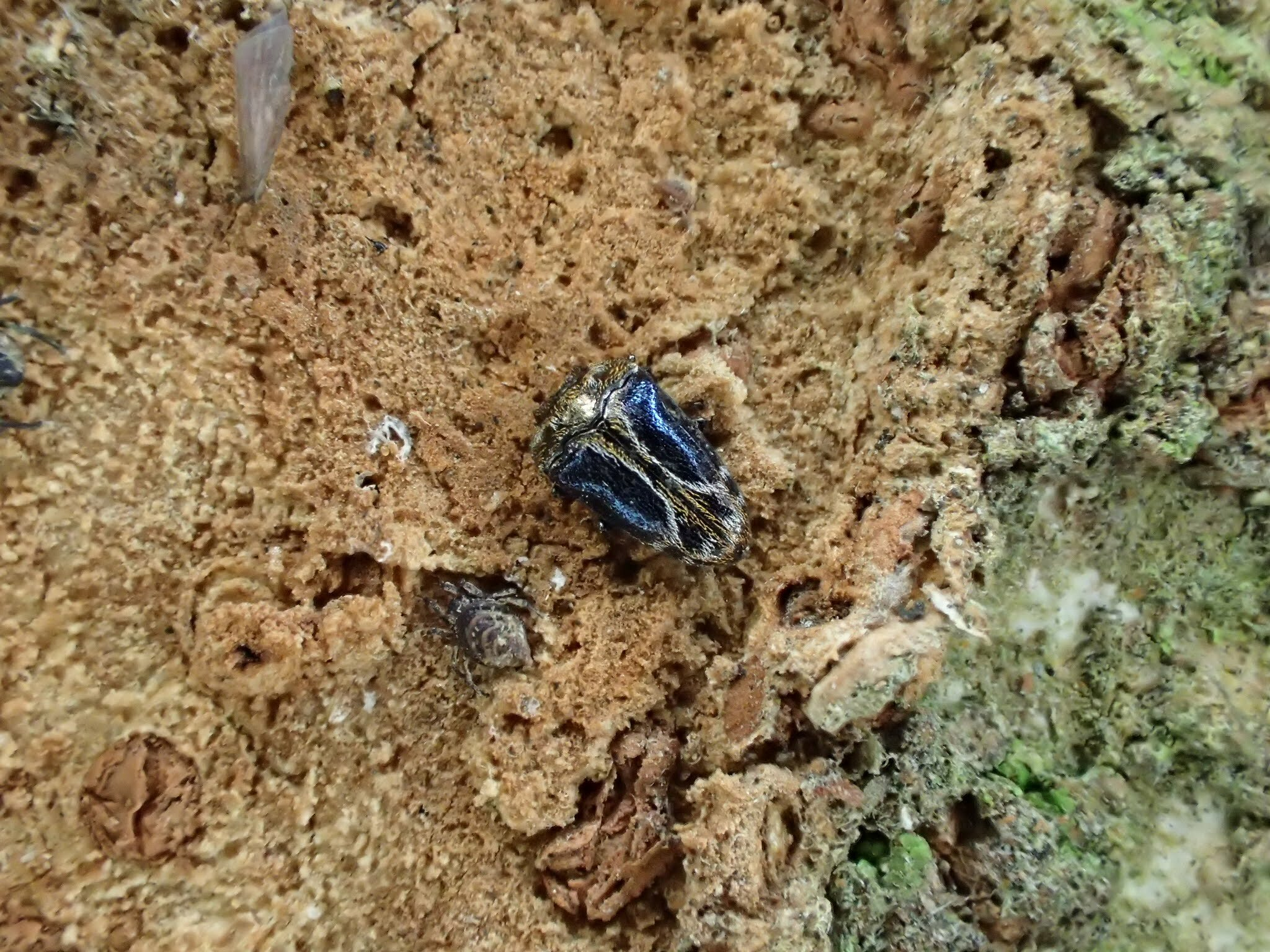
Habroloma lewisii, Japan

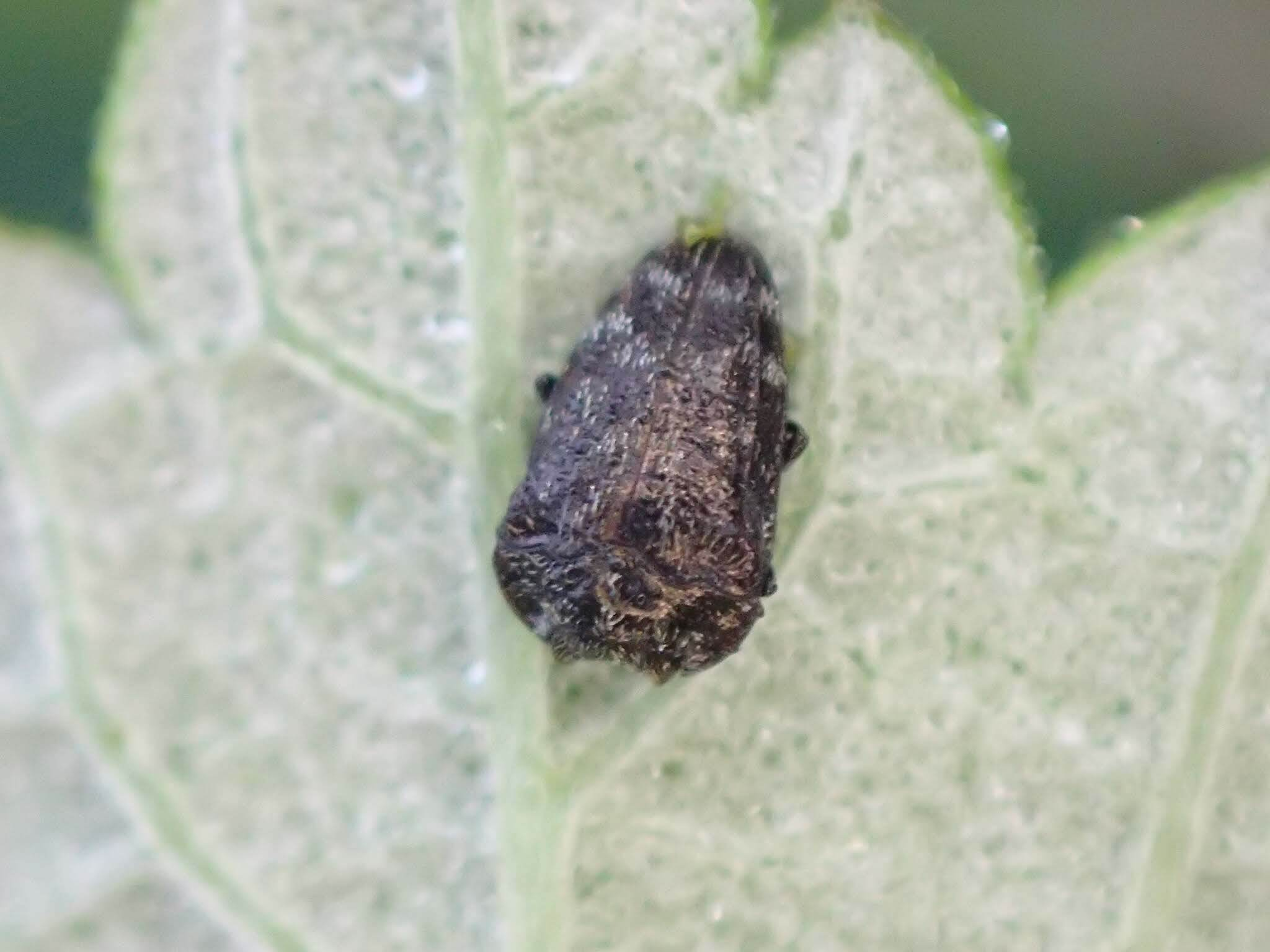
Habroloma subbicorne, Japan

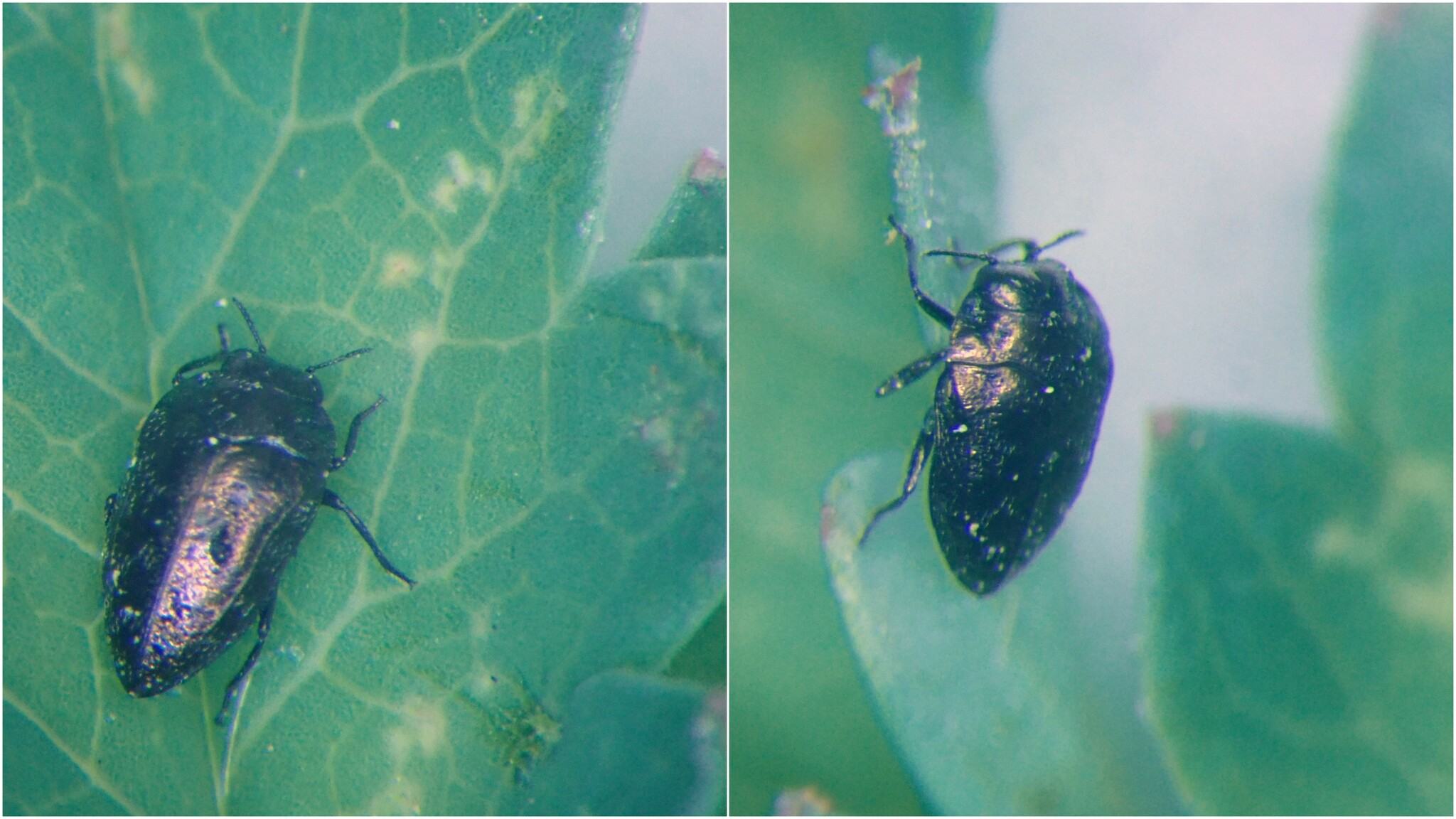
Habroloma triangulare, France

Habroloma is a genus of metallic wood-boring beetles in the family Buprestidae. There are more than 280 described species in Habroloma, found in the Old World.

== Species ==
These 287 species belong to the genus Habroloma:

- Habroloma absterrens (Obenberger, 1937)
- Habroloma acceptum (Kerremans, 1894)
- Habroloma accomodatum (Obenberger, 1937)
- Habroloma acuminatum (Deyrolle, 1864)
- Habroloma acutum (Kerremans, 1893)
- Habroloma aeneocupreum (Kerremans, 1890)
- Habroloma aeneolum (Kerremans, 1900)
- Habroloma aeneopygum (Deyrolle, 1864)
- Habroloma aetatulum (Obenberger, 1937)
- Habroloma affinis (Kerremans, 1900)
- Habroloma aglaogeum (Obenberger, 1929)
- Habroloma albographum (Deyrolle, 1864)
- Habroloma albomaculatum (Deyrolle, 1864)
- Habroloma albopictum (Kerremans, 1895)
- Habroloma alphaxium (Obenberger, 1929)
- Habroloma amabilis (Kerremans, 1900)
- Habroloma amplicollis Descarpentries & Villiers, 1966
- Habroloma anchiale (Obenberger, 1929)
- Habroloma andaicum (Kerremans, 1900)
- Habroloma andrei Descarpentries & Villiers, 1964
- Habroloma androgaeum (Obenberger, 1930)
- Habroloma andromache (Obenberger, 1929)
- Habroloma angilium (Obenberger, 1930)
- Habroloma anita (Obenberger, 1929)
- Habroloma annulatum Descarpentries & Villiers, 1964
- Habroloma antiquum (Kerremans, 1900)
- Habroloma antonia (Obenberger, 1929)
- Habroloma apellum (Obenberger, 1929)
- Habroloma apicatum (Chevrolat, 1838)
- Habroloma arche (Obenberger, 1929)
- Habroloma argathrum (Obenberger, 1937)
- Habroloma argenteum (Motschulsky, 1861)
- Habroloma asahinai Kurosawa, 1959
- Habroloma astraeum (Obenberger, 1929)
- Habroloma atronitidum (Gebhardt, 1929)
- Habroloma auberti (Théry, 1912)
- Habroloma aureum Semenov, 1890
- Habroloma australasiae (Gestro, 1877)
- Habroloma australis (Macleay, 1888)
- Habroloma babakanum (Fisher, 1935)
- Habroloma baebium (Obenberger, 1929)
- Habroloma bakerianum (Obenberger, 1924)
- Habroloma bangueyanum (Kerremans, 1900)
- Habroloma basilicum (Deyrolle, 1864)
- Habroloma baucis (Obenberger, 1929)
- Habroloma baudoni Descarpentries & Villiers, 1966
- Habroloma baumi (Obenberger, 1929)
- Habroloma benguetense (Obenberger, 1930)
- Habroloma berenice (Obenberger, 1929)
- Habroloma bicarinatum (Kerremans, 1892)
- Habroloma bifrons (Kiesenwetter, 1879)
- Habroloma binhense Descarpentries & Villiers, 1964
- Habroloma borchsenii Alexeev, 1989
- Habroloma brachycephalum (Gebhardt, 1929)
- Habroloma breiti (Obenberger, 1918)
- Habroloma caium (Obenberger, 1930)
- Habroloma callisto (Obenberger, 1930)
- Habroloma calypso (Obenberger, 1929)
- Habroloma camerunicum (Kerremans, 1899)
- Habroloma canace (Obenberger, 1929)
- Habroloma canidium (Obenberger, 1930)
- Habroloma capense (Gory, 1841)
- Habroloma carinatum (Deyrolle, 1864)
- Habroloma carnum (Obenberger, 1930)
- Habroloma cassiope (Obenberger, 1929)
- Habroloma ceres (Obenberger, 1929)
- Habroloma cheni Théry, 1935
- Habroloma chromatum (Deyrolle, 1864)
- Habroloma circe (Obenberger, 1929)
- Habroloma clotho (Obenberger, 1929)
- Habroloma clymene (Obenberger, 1929)
- Habroloma clythium (Obenberger, 1930)
- Habroloma confinis (Kerremans, 1894)
- Habroloma confusum (Deyrolle, 1864)
- Habroloma congener (Kerremans, 1900)
- Habroloma conscriptum (Obenberger, 1924)
- Habroloma coomani Descarpentries & Villiers, 1964
- Habroloma cornutum (Kerremans, 1914)
- Habroloma corpulentum (Kerremans, 1900)
- Habroloma costipennis (Kerremans, 1900)
- Habroloma crataeis (Obenberger, 1930)
- Habroloma cuneiformis (Fisher, 1921)
- Habroloma cupricaudum (Deyrolle, 1864)
- Habroloma curvifrons (Kerremans, 1900)
- Habroloma dajakorum (Obenberger, 1924)
- Habroloma daoense Descarpentries & Villiers, 1964
- Habroloma davidianum (Obenberger, 1930)
- Habroloma decoratum (Deyrolle, 1864)
- Habroloma decorum (Deyrolle, 1864)
- Habroloma delectabilis (Kerremans, 1900)
- Habroloma dentiscapum Descarpentries & Villiers, 1966
- Habroloma depressifrons (Deyrolle, 1864)
- Habroloma dessumi Descarpentries & Villiers, 1966
- Habroloma discophorum (Kerremans, 1912)
- Habroloma discretum (Kerremans, 1903)
- Habroloma dissimilis (Kerremans, 1900)
- Habroloma drusillum (Obenberger, 1929)
- Habroloma echidnum (Obenberger, 1929)
- Habroloma edusum (Obenberger, 1930)
- Habroloma egerium (Obenberger, 1930)
- Habroloma elaeocarpusi Kato & Kawakita, 2023
- Habroloma elissa (Obenberger, 1929)
- Habroloma elyssium (Obenberger, 1930)
- Habroloma embrikstrandellum (Obenberger, 1936)
- Habroloma ennium (Obenberger, 1937)
- Habroloma ephyrum (Obenberger, 1930)
- Habroloma epimethis (Obenberger, 1937)
- Habroloma erichtho (Obenberger, 1929)
- Habroloma erigone (Obenberger, 1930)
- Habroloma eriphylum (Obenberger, 1930)
- Habroloma euchariessum (Gebhardt, 1929)
- Habroloma euchloris (Obenberger, 1930)
- Habroloma eximium (Lewis, 1893)
- Habroloma fasciatum (Gory & Laporte, 1840)
- Habroloma frater Descarpentries & Villiers, 1964
- Habroloma fraternum (Kerremans, 1900)
- Habroloma frenchi (van de Poll, 1887)
- Habroloma gamadegum (Obenberger, 1937)
- Habroloma gardneri Théry, 1930
- Habroloma gaylae Bellamy, 1999
- Habroloma gentilis (Kerremans, 1894)
- Habroloma glabrum (Fisher, 1921)
- Habroloma glyphicum Holynski, 2003
- Habroloma gnomum Holynski, 2003
- Habroloma gracilis (Obenberger, 1921)
- Habroloma gratiosissimum (Obenberger, 1937)
- Habroloma griseonigrum (Saunders, 1873)
- Habroloma hewitti (Kerremans, 1912)
- Habroloma hikosanense Kurosawa, 1959
- Habroloma hilaris (Kerremans, 1894)
- Habroloma hofferi (Obenberger, 1937)
- Habroloma hoscheki (Obenberger, 1917)
- Habroloma hovasianum (Kerremans, 1903)
- Habroloma hovum (Théry, 1905)
- Habroloma humeralis (Kerremans, 1895)
- Habroloma humilis (Deyrolle, 1864)
- Habroloma hyale (Obenberger, 1930)
- Habroloma ignotum (Kerremans, 1900)
- Habroloma insidiosum (Kerremans, 1900)
- Habroloma integrum (Kerremans, 1892)
- Habroloma irregularis (Deyrolle, 1864)
- Habroloma jacobsoni (Fisher, 1926)
- Habroloma jolas (Obenberger, 1930)
- Habroloma kedahae (Fisher, 1930)
- Habroloma kinabalense (Fisher, 1932)
- Habroloma klossi (Fisher, 1930)
- Habroloma konbirense (Kerremans, 1900)
- Habroloma lacunosum (Deyrolle, 1864)
- Habroloma laetum (Kerremans, 1894)
- Habroloma lagerstroemiae Descarpentries, 1958
- Habroloma lalage (Obenberger, 1929)
- Habroloma lanceolatum (Kerremans, 1895)
- Habroloma languidum (Kerremans, 1894)
- Habroloma laosense Descarpentries & Villiers, 1966
- Habroloma lateroalbum Ohmomo, 2004
- Habroloma laticollis (Deyrolle, 1864)
- Habroloma laxulum (Obenberger, 1952)
- Habroloma lepidopterum (Deyrolle, 1864)
- Habroloma lewisii (Saunders, 1873)
- Habroloma lilliputanum (Kerremans, 1890)
- Habroloma lineatum (Kerremans, 1900)
- Habroloma liukiuense (Obenberger, 1940)
- Habroloma longipilis Descarpentries & Villiers, 1964
- Habroloma lubricum (Deyrolle, 1864)
- Habroloma maerum (Obenberger, 1930)
- Habroloma malaccanum (Obenberger, 1929)
- Habroloma marginicolle (Fairmaire, 1888)
- Habroloma massaicum (Kerremans, 1908)
- Habroloma mathiauxi (Théry, 1909)
- Habroloma medeum (Obenberger, 1929)
- Habroloma medium (Kerremans, 1900)
- Habroloma meo Descarpentries & Villiers, 1966
- Habroloma metallicum (Fisher, 1921)
- Habroloma mianum (Obenberger, 1924)
- Habroloma mindanaoense (Fisher, 1921)
- Habroloma minotaurum Holynski, 2003
- Habroloma mirabilis (Kerremans, 1912)
- Habroloma miwai (Obenberger, 1929)
- Habroloma mocquerysi (Théry, 1905)
- Habroloma modestum (Kerremans, 1900)
- Habroloma modicum (Kerremans, 1900)
- Habroloma moestum (Kerremans, 1900)
- Habroloma monardi Théry, 1947
- Habroloma mongolicum Cobos, 1968
- Habroloma monstricornis (Obenberger, 1937)
- Habroloma morosum (Kerremans, 1893)
- Habroloma murinum (Deyrolle, 1864)
- Habroloma myrmecophila Bílý, Fikácek & Sípek, 2008
- Habroloma naghmum (Obenberger, 1937)
- Habroloma nanum (Paykull, 1799)
- Habroloma narangum (Obenberger, 1937)
- Habroloma nausicaum (Obenberger, 1929)
- Habroloma nixilla (Obenberger, 1929)
- Habroloma nobilitatum (Kerremans, 1900)
- Habroloma notatum (Deyrolle, 1864)
- Habroloma nubilum (Deyrolle, 1864)
- Habroloma obsoletum (Chevrolat, 1838)
- Habroloma oreophilum (Fisher, 1930)
- Habroloma orestea (Obenberger, 1929)
- Habroloma palawana (Kerremans, 1898)
- Habroloma parallelicollis (Deyrolle, 1864)
- Habroloma pauperulum (Kerremans, 1896)
- Habroloma paviei Descarpentries & Villiers, 1966
- Habroloma perakae (Fisher, 1933)
- Habroloma perplexum (Kerremans, 1900)
- Habroloma perroti Descarpentries & Villiers, 1964
- Habroloma philippinense (Fisher, 1921)
- Habroloma phrixium (Obenberger, 1929)
- Habroloma picturatum (Deyrolle, 1864)
- Habroloma pigrum (Théry, 1912)
- Habroloma placidum (Kerremans, 1900)
- Habroloma politum (Kerremans, 1892)
- Habroloma pondolanum (Obenberger, 1937)
- Habroloma populum (Deyrolle, 1864)
- Habroloma praorum (Obenberger, 1924)
- Habroloma praxilla (Obenberger, 1929)
- Habroloma preangense (Obenberger, 1924)
- Habroloma pretiosum (Théry, 1904)
- Habroloma pretoriense (Kerremans, 1903)
- Habroloma protracticolle (Obenberger, 1918)
- Habroloma prudens (Kerremans, 1900)
- Habroloma pseudacutum (Obenberger, 1929)
- Habroloma pulicarium (Deyrolle, 1864)
- Habroloma pupillum (Kerremans, 1894)
- Habroloma pustulosum (Fairmaire, 1903)
- Habroloma raffrayi Théry, 1927
- Habroloma regium (Kerremans, 1914)
- Habroloma repetitrix (Obenberger, 1937)
- Habroloma resillum (Deyrolle, 1864)
- Habroloma roscium (Obenberger, 1929)
- Habroloma rubripilis (Obenberger, 1929)
- Habroloma rudis (Kerremans, 1892)
- Habroloma rufoapicalis Descarpentries & Villiers, 1964
- Habroloma rugatum (Kerremans, 1892)
- Habroloma rungsi Baudon, 1959
- Habroloma salisburyense (Obenberger, 1937)
- Habroloma sandakanum (Obenberger, 1924)
- Habroloma sassum (Obenberger, 1952)
- Habroloma saundersi (Lewis, 1893)
- Habroloma saundersianum (Obenberger, 1924)
- Habroloma sellatulum (Obenberger, 1930)
- Habroloma sembilanense (Obenberger, 1929)
- Habroloma septimia (Obenberger, 1929)
- Habroloma setosulum (Deyrolle, 1864)
- Habroloma simplex (Deyrolle, 1864)
- Habroloma sincerum (Kerremans, 1900)
- Habroloma singhalesum (Obenberger, 1929)
- Habroloma sinnicum (Obenberger, 1929)
- Habroloma socialis (Lea, 1894)
- Habroloma soror Descarpentries & Villiers, 1964
- Habroloma sparsum (Kerremans, 1893)
- Habroloma speciosellum (Obenberger, 1924)
- Habroloma spinicornis Descarpentries & Villiers, 1964
- Habroloma stigmaticum (Kerremans, 1892)
- Habroloma subalutaceum (Pic, 1921)
- Habroloma subbicorne (Motshulsky, 1860)
- Habroloma subfasciatum (Kerremans, 1894)
- Habroloma taciturnum (Kerremans, 1894)
- Habroloma tangonense Descarpentries & Villiers, 1966
- Habroloma taxillusi Kato & Kawakita, 2023
- Habroloma taygeto (Obenberger, 1929)
- Habroloma tecmessa (Obenberger, 1929)
- Habroloma tetrum (Kerremans, 1900)
- Habroloma thamentis (Obenberger, 1937)
- Habroloma theryi Rungs, 1936
- Habroloma thomasseti (Théry, 1928)
- Habroloma topali (Holynski, 1981)
- Habroloma triangulare (Lacordaire, 1835)
- Habroloma tyanum (Obenberger, 1937)
- Habroloma tyli (Obenberger, 1930)
- Habroloma uniformatum (Obenberger, 1924)
- Habroloma vansoni (Obenberger, 1937)
- Habroloma variegatum (Deyrolle, 1864)
- Habroloma velutinum Théry, 1912
- Habroloma vestum (Obenberger, 1929)
- Habroloma vexator (Kerremans, 1892)
- Habroloma vientianense Descarpentries & Villiers, 1966
- Habroloma vilis (Deyrolle, 1864)
- Habroloma viridipenne Théry, 1940
- Habroloma vividum (Théry, 1905)
- Habroloma wagneri (Gebhardt, 1928)
- Habroloma weyersi (Kerremans, 1900)
- Habroloma xamarthum (Obenberger, 1937)
- Habroloma xargenteum (Motschulsky, 1861)
- Habroloma yuasai Kurosawa, 1976
- Habroloma zaghanum (Obenberger, 1937)
- Habroloma zululanum (Obenberger, 1938)
