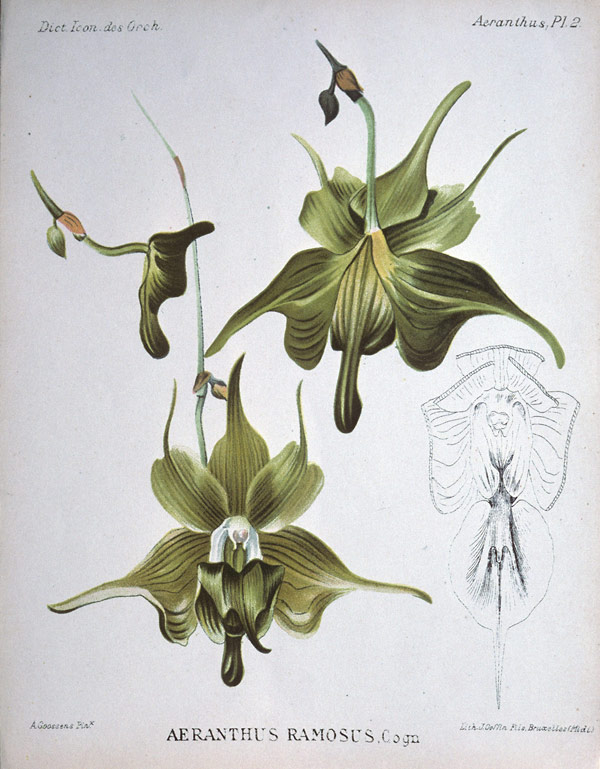
- Illustration of Aeranthes ramosa

Conservation status
- Vulnerable (IUCN 3.1)

Scientific classification
- Kingdom: Plantae
- Clade: Tracheophytes
- Clade: Angiosperms
- Clade: Monocots
- Order: Asparagales
- Family: Orchidaceae
- Subfamily: Epidendroideae
- Genus: Aeranthes
- Species: A. ramosa

Binomial name
- Aeranthes ramosa Rolfe (1901)

= Aeranthes ramosa =

Species of orchid

Aeranthes ramosa is a species of orchid native to Madagascar.
