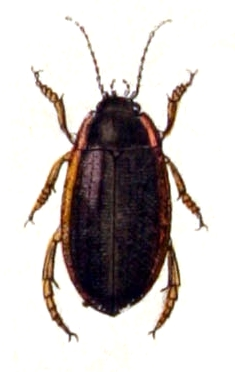

Scientific classification
- Kingdom: Animalia
- Phylum: Arthropoda
- Class: Insecta
- Order: Coleoptera
- Suborder: Adephaga
- Family: Dytiscidae
- Genus: Colymbetes
- Species: C. striatus

Binomial name
- Colymbetes striatus (Linnaeus, 1758)

= Colymbetes striatus =

Species of beetle

Colymbetes striatus is a species of beetle native to the Palearctic, including Europe. In Europe, it is only found in Belarus, Belgium, Bosnia and Herzegovina, Croatia, the Czech Republic, mainland Denmark, Estonia, Finland, mainland France, Germany, Hungary, Kaliningrad, Latvia, Lithuania, mainland Norway, Poland, Russia, Slovakia, Slovenia, Sweden, and Ukraine.
