= Aeranthes albidiflora =

Conservation status
- Critically Endangered (IUCN 3.1)

Scientific classification
- Kingdom: Plantae
- Clade: Embryophytes
- Clade: Tracheophytes
- Clade: Spermatophytes
- Clade: Angiosperms
- Clade: Monocots
- Order: Asparagales
- Family: Orchidaceae
- Subfamily: Epidendroideae
- Genus: Aeranthes
- Species: A. albidiflora

Binomial name
- Aeranthes albidiflora Toill.-Gen., Ursch & Bosser

Species of orchid

Aeranthes albidiflora is a species of orchid native to Madagascar. It may be extinct due to illegal collection and logging.
