= Aeranthes adenopoda =

Conservation status
- Vulnerable (IUCN 3.1)

Scientific classification
- Kingdom: Plantae
- Clade: Tracheophytes
- Clade: Angiosperms
- Clade: Monocots
- Order: Asparagales
- Family: Orchidaceae
- Subfamily: Epidendroideae
- Genus: Aeranthes
- Species: A. adenopoda

Binomial name
- Aeranthes adenopoda H.Perrier (1938)

Species of orchid

Aeranthes adenopoda is a species of orchid native to Madagascar. It was first described by H. Perrier in 1938. Its IUCN status is Vulnerable.
