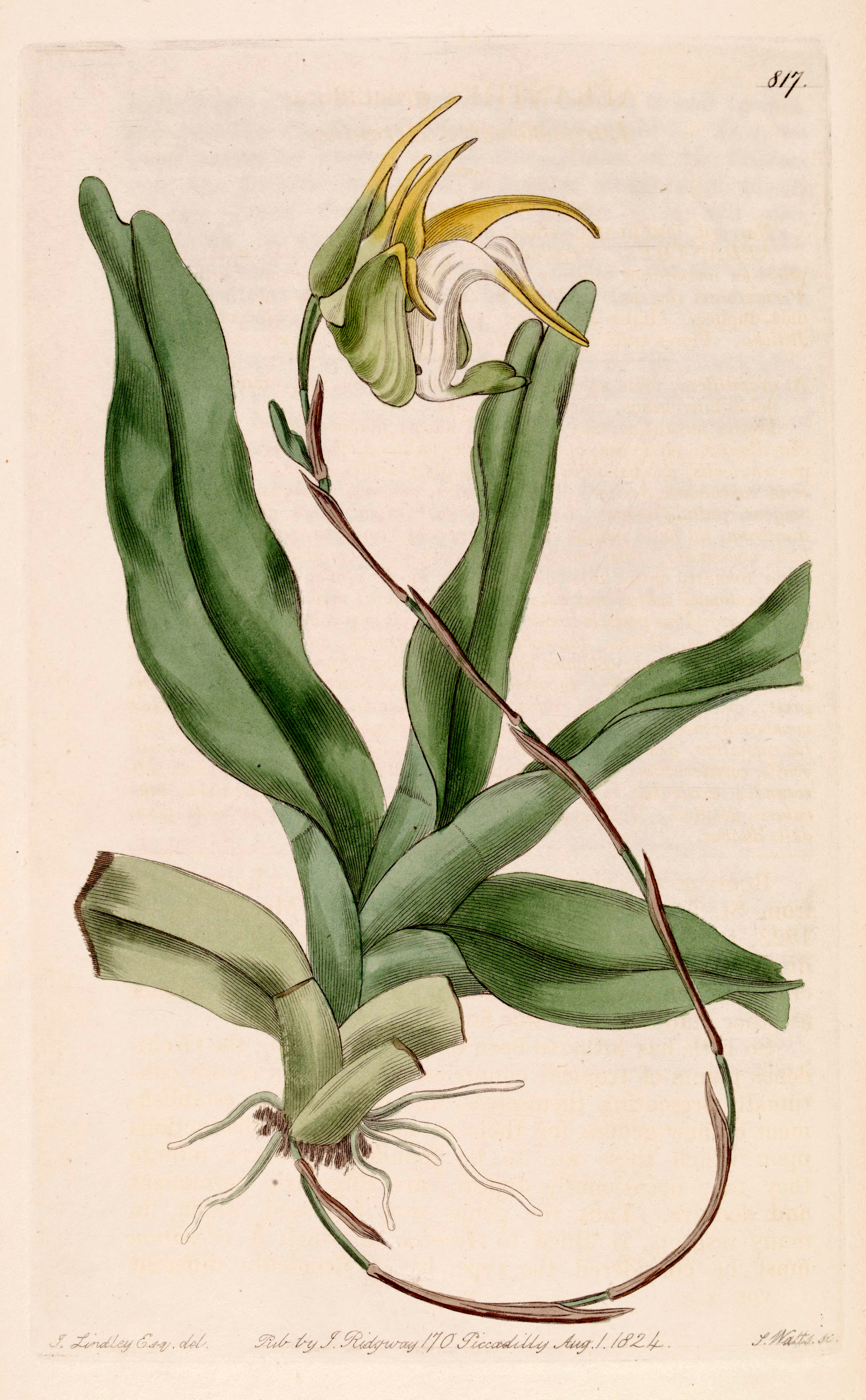
- 1824 illustration

Scientific classification
- Kingdom: Plantae
- Clade: Tracheophytes
- Clade: Angiosperms
- Clade: Monocots
- Order: Asparagales
- Family: Orchidaceae
- Subfamily: Epidendroideae
- Genus: Aeranthes
- Species: A. grandiflora

Binomial name
- Aeranthes grandiflora Lindl. (1824)

Synonyms
- Angraecum grandiflorum (Lindl.) auct. (1895); Aeranthes brachycentron Regel (1890)

= Aeranthes grandiflora =

Species of orchid

Aeranthes grandiflora is a species of orchid and is the type species of its genus. It is native to Madagascar and Comoros. It is characterized by long, spindly, naturally hanging inflorescences and relatively large, semi-translucent flowers which open successively over a long period of time. A gardener must not cut the inflorescence after the first flower has faded, as these plants rebloom abundantly.

Home culture for this species is among the easiest of any orchid. A gardener can give them small pots of small-grade bark and moss with medium-warm temperatures (winter nights between 55 and 65 degrees Fahrenheit) and place them under low light of any orientation or even fluorescent lights.
