= Copelatus posticatus =

Scientific classification
- Domain: Eukaryota
- Kingdom: Animalia
- Phylum: Arthropoda
- Class: Insecta
- Order: Coleoptera
- Suborder: Adephaga
- Family: Dytiscidae
- Genus: Copelatus
- Species: C. posticatus

Binomial name
- Copelatus posticatus (Fabricius, 1801)

Synonyms
- Colymbetes elegans; Colymbetes multistriatus; Copelatus signatus; Dytiscus posticatus

Species of beetle

Copelatus posticatus is a species of diving beetle. It is part of the subfamily Copelatinae in the family Dytiscidae. It was described by Fabricius in 1801.
