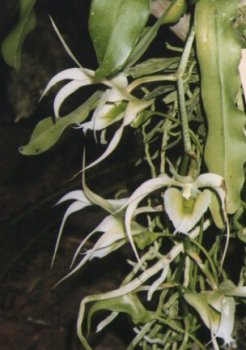

Scientific classification
- Kingdom: Plantae
- Clade: Tracheophytes
- Clade: Angiosperms
- Clade: Monocots
- Order: Asparagales
- Family: Orchidaceae
- Subfamily: Epidendroideae
- Genus: Aeranthes
- Species: A. henricii

Binomial name
- Aeranthes henricii Schltr. (1925)

Synonyms
- Erasanthe henricii (Schltr.) P.J. Cribb, Hermans & D.L. Roberts (2007)

= Aeranthes henricii =

Species of orchid

Aeranthes henricii is a species of orchid.
