= Colymbetes densus =

Scientific classification
- Domain: Eukaryota
- Kingdom: Animalia
- Phylum: Arthropoda
- Class: Insecta
- Order: Coleoptera
- Suborder: Adephaga
- Family: Dytiscidae
- Genus: Colymbetes
- Species: C. densus

Binomial name
- Colymbetes densus LeConte, 1859

Species of beetle

Colymbetes densus is a species of predaceous diving beetle in the family Dytiscidae. It is found in North America.

== Subspecies ==
These two subspecies belong to the species Colymbetes densus:

- Colymbetes densus densus LeConte, 1859
- Colymbetes densus inaequalis Horn, 1871
