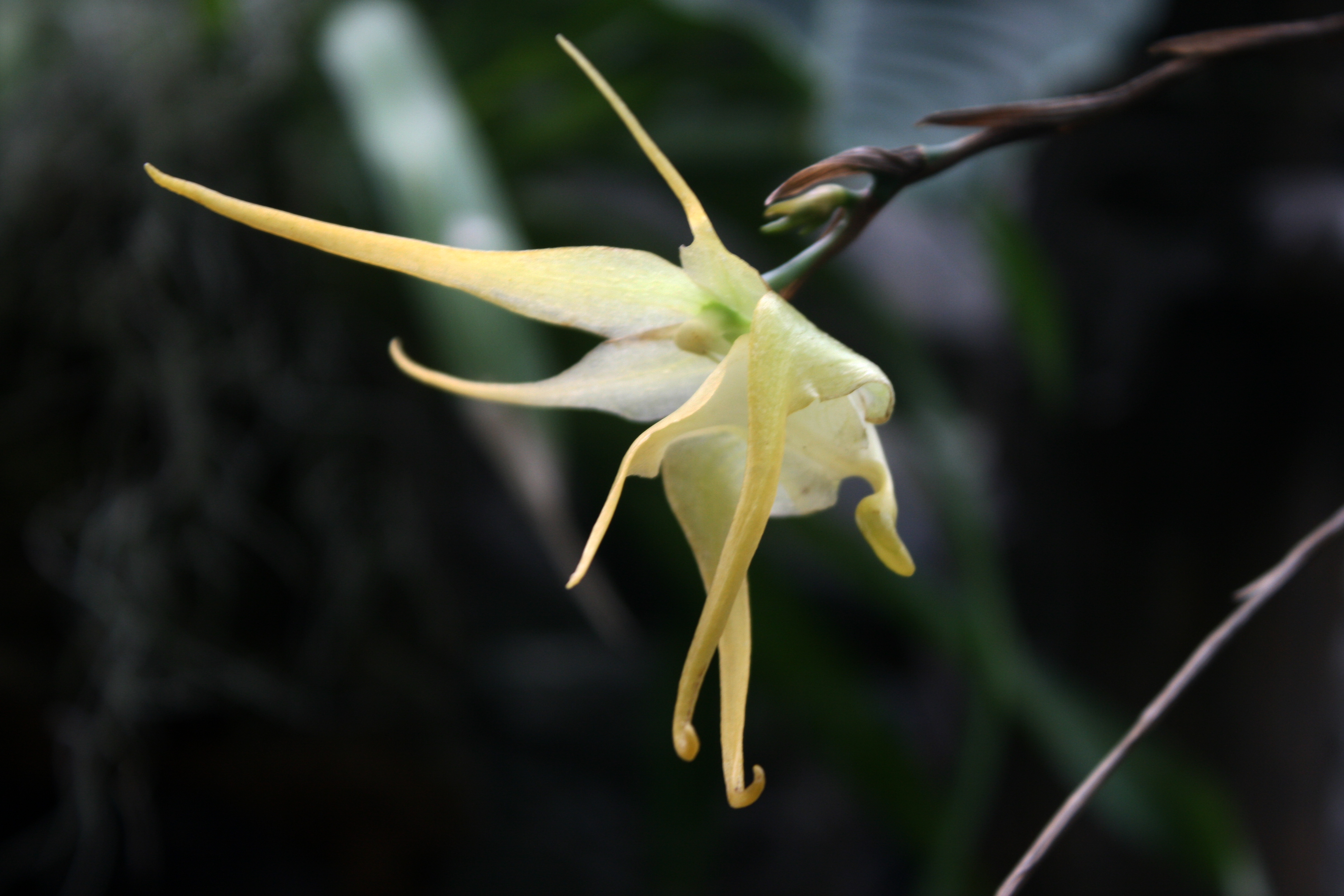

Scientific classification
- Kingdom: Plantae
- Clade: Tracheophytes
- Clade: Angiosperms
- Clade: Monocots
- Order: Asparagales
- Family: Orchidaceae
- Subfamily: Epidendroideae
- Genus: Aeranthes
- Species: A. arachnites

Binomial name
- Aeranthes arachnites (Thouars) Lindl.

Synonyms
- Dendrobium arachnites Thouars; Aeranthes arachnites var. genuinus Cordem., invalid; Aeranthes grandiflora Lindl., illegitimate; Aeranthes arachnites var. balfourii S.Moore in J.G.Baker

= Aeranthes arachnites =

Species of orchid

Aeranthes arachnites is an orchid native to the Mascarene Islands of the Indian Ocean (Mauritius, Réunion and Rodrigues).
