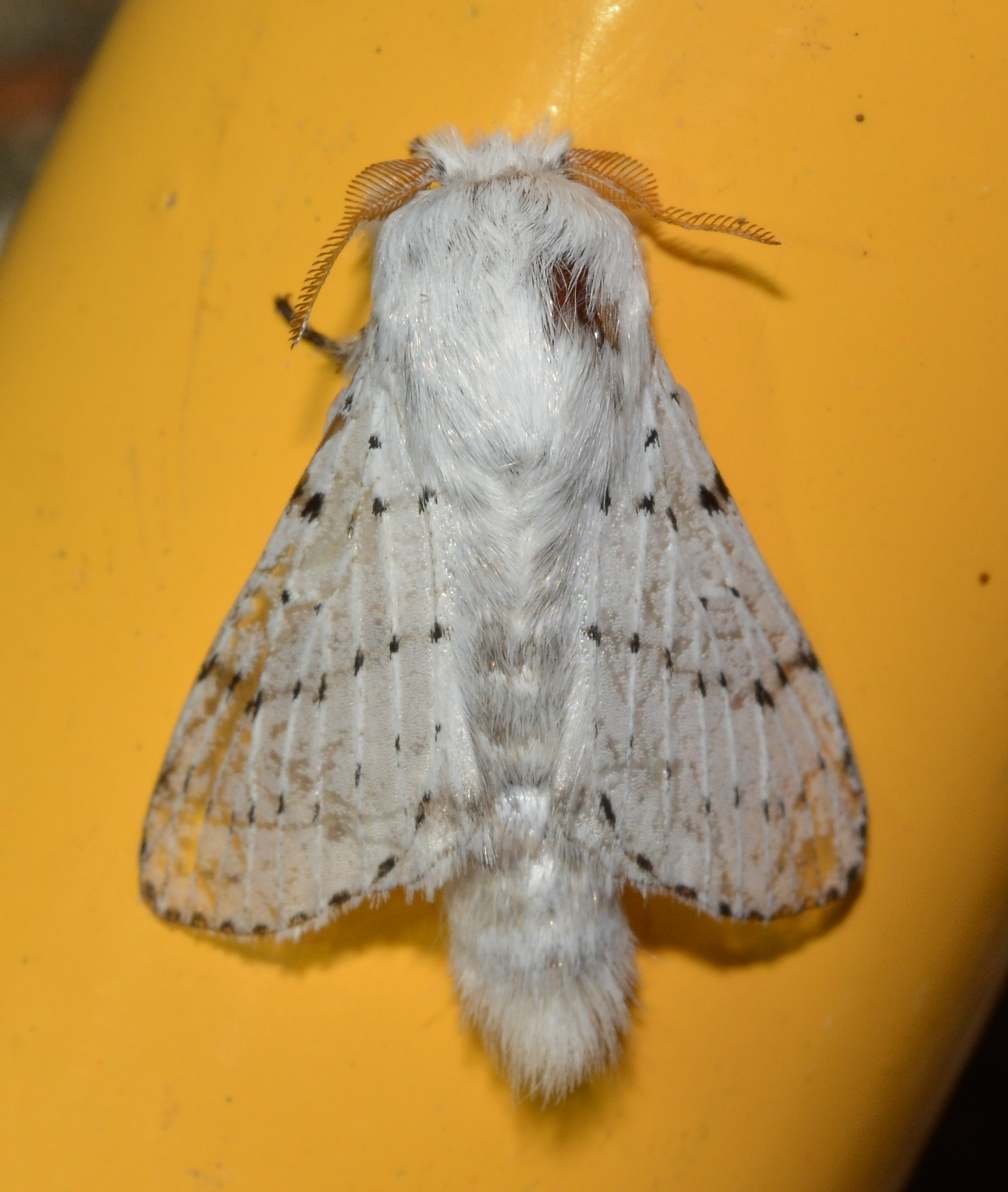
- Artace cribrarius

Scientific classification
- Kingdom: Animalia
- Phylum: Arthropoda
- Clade: Pancrustacea
- Class: Insecta
- Order: Lepidoptera
- Family: Lasiocampidae
- Subfamily: Poecilocampinae
- Tribe: Macromphaliini
- Genus: Artace; Walker, 1855

= Artace =

Genus of moths

Artace is a genus of moths in the family Lasiocampidae. The genus was erected by Francis Walker in 1855.

== Species ==
- Artace aemula Draudt, 1927
- Artace albicans Walker, 1855
- Artace anula Schaus, 1892
- Artace argentina Schaus, 1924
- Artace athoria Schaus, 1936
- Artace cinerosipalpis Bryk, 1953
- Artace colaria Franclemont, 1973
- Artace connecta Draudt, 1927
- Artace coprea Draudt, 1927
- Artace cribrarius (Ljungh, 1825)
- Artace etta Schaus, 1936
- Artace helier Schaus, 1924
- Artace lilloi Giacomelli, 1911
- Artace litterata Dognin, 1923
- Artace melanda Schaus, 1936
- Artace menuve Schaus, 1924
- Artace meridionalis Schaus, 1892
- Artace muzophila Dognin, 1916
- Artace nigripalpis Dognin, 1923
- Artace obumbrata Köhler, 1951
- Artace pelia Schaus, 1936
- Artace punctivena Walker, 1855
- Artace randa Schaus, 1936
- Artace regalis E. D. Jones, 1921
- Artace rosea Draudt, 1927
- Artace schreiteria Schaus, 1936
- Artace sisoes Schaus, 1924
- Artace thelma Schaus, 1936

== "Venezuelan poodle moth" ==
In 2009, German zoologist Dr. Arthur Anker photographed a moth in the Canaima National Park of the Gran Sabana region of Venezuela, and the photograph went "viral" on the internet, including hoaxes claiming to be additional photos. Anker initially captioned his photo as "Poodle moth, Venezuela", and later added " (Artace sp, perhaps A. cribaria)".

Dr. John E. Rawlins from the Carnegie Museum of Natural History concurred with Anker's suggestion of the genus Artace for the identification:

Here’s my vote/guess to ID the poodle moth. The antenna is distinctive. "Lasiocampidae: Artace or a related genus, probably not Artace cribraria (presumably North America to Argentina, but nobody has revised this group from Mexico south). There are more than a dozen described South American species of Artace, but their delimitation, validity, and even their generic placement is uncertain. It will take two things to solve this problem: a comprehensive revision of Artace and kin, plus an actual specimen of a genuine “Venezuelan poodle moth.”
