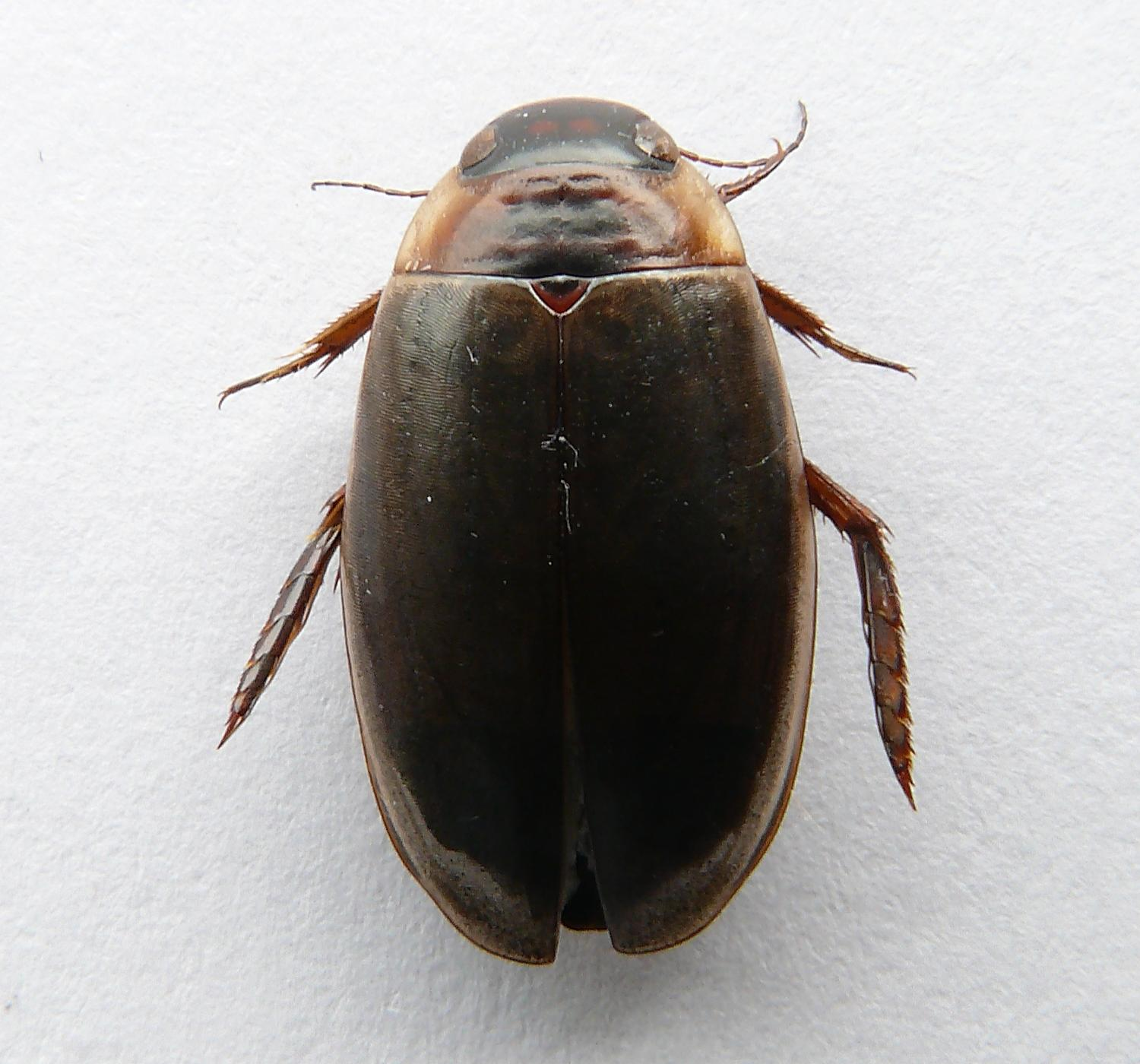
- Colymbetes fuscus

Scientific classification
- Kingdom: Animalia
- Phylum: Arthropoda
- Class: Insecta
- Order: Coleoptera
- Suborder: Adephaga
- Family: Dytiscidae
- Genus: Colymbetes
- Species: C. fuscus

Binomial name
- Colymbetes fuscus (Linnaeus, 1758)

= Colymbetes fuscus =

Species of beetle

Colymbetes fuscus is a species of beetle native to the Palearctic, including Europe, the Near East and North Africa. In Europe, it is only found in Austria, the Balearic Islands, Belarus, Belgium, Bosnia and Herzegovina, Great Britain including Shetland, Orkney, Hebrides and Isle of Man, Bulgaria, the Channel Islands, Corsica, Croatia, Cyprus, the Czech Republic, mainland Denmark, Estonia, European Turkey, Finland, mainland France, Germany, mainland Greece, Hungary, the Republic of Ireland, mainland Italy, Kaliningrad, Latvia, Liechtenstein, Lithuania, Luxembourg, Malta, Northern Ireland, North Macedonia, mainland Norway, Poland, mainland Portugal, Russia except in the North, Sardinia, Sicily, Slovakia, Slovenia, mainland Spain, Sweden, Switzerland, the Netherlands, Ukraine and Yugoslavia.
