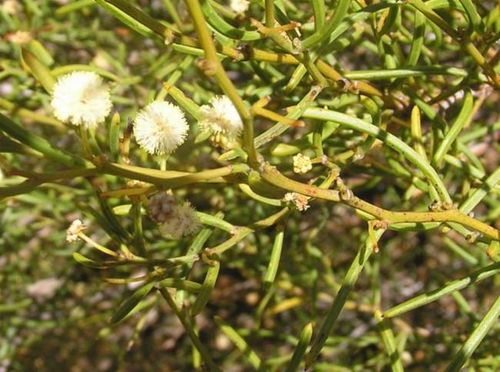
- Acacia aemula subsp. muricata

Conservation status
- Least Concern (IUCN 3.1)

Scientific classification
- Kingdom: Plantae
- Clade: Tracheophytes
- Clade: Angiosperms
- Clade: Eudicots
- Clade: Rosids
- Order: Fabales
- Family: Fabaceae
- Subfamily: Caesalpinioideae
- Clade: Mimosoid clade
- Genus: Acacia
- Species: A. aemula

Binomial name
- Acacia aemula Maslin
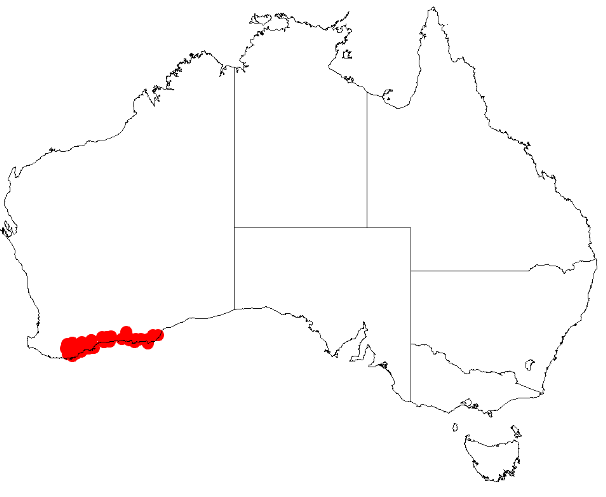
- Occurrence data from AVH

Synonyms
- Racosperma aemulum (Maslin) Pedley

= Acacia aemula =

Species of legume

Acacia aemula is a species of flowering plant in the family Fabaceae and is endemic to the south coast of Western Australia. It is an openly-branched, often prostrate, rush-like subshrub with cylindrical to more or less flat and linear phyllodes similar to its branchlets, spherical heads of cream-coloured or golden-yellow flowers and reddish-brown, thin, paper-like or crusty pods.

== Description ==
Acacia aemula is an openly-branched, often protrate, rush-like subshrub that typically grows to a height of 20–40 cm (7.9–15.7 in) and has cylindrical branchlets. Its few phyllodes are similar to its branchlets, cylindrical to more or less flat and linear, 10–110 mm (0.39–4.33 in) long and 1–2 mm (0.039–0.079 in) wide. There are stipules 2–3 mm (0.079–0.118 in) long at the base of the phyllodes. The flowers are borne in 1 or 2 spherical heads on peduncles 5–15 mm (0.20–0.59 in) long, each head with 6 to 11 cream-coloured to golden-yellow flowers. Flowering occurs from about May to June and the pods are reddish-brown, paper-like to crusty, 30–60 mm (1.2–2.4 in) long and 4–5 mm (0.16–0.20 in) wide containing seeds 4–5 mm (0.16–0.20 in) wide with a conical aril.

== Taxonomy ==
Acacia aemula was first formally described in 1995 by the botanist Bruce Maslin in the journal Nuytsia. The specific epithet (aemula) means "rivalling or more or less equalling", referring to the similarity of the branchlets and phyllodes.

The names of two subspecies of A. aemula are accepted by the Australian Plant Census:

- Acacia aemula subsp. aemula has smooth phyllodes and golden-yellow flowers.
- Acacia aemula subsp. muricata has rough phyllodes and cream-coloured flowers.

== Distribution ==
This acacia is found along the south coast of Western Australia in the Great Southern and Goldfields-Esperance regions extending from around Albany east to Cape Arid National Park where it grows among granite outcrops and flats near creeks in sandy soils.

== See also ==
- List of Acacia species
