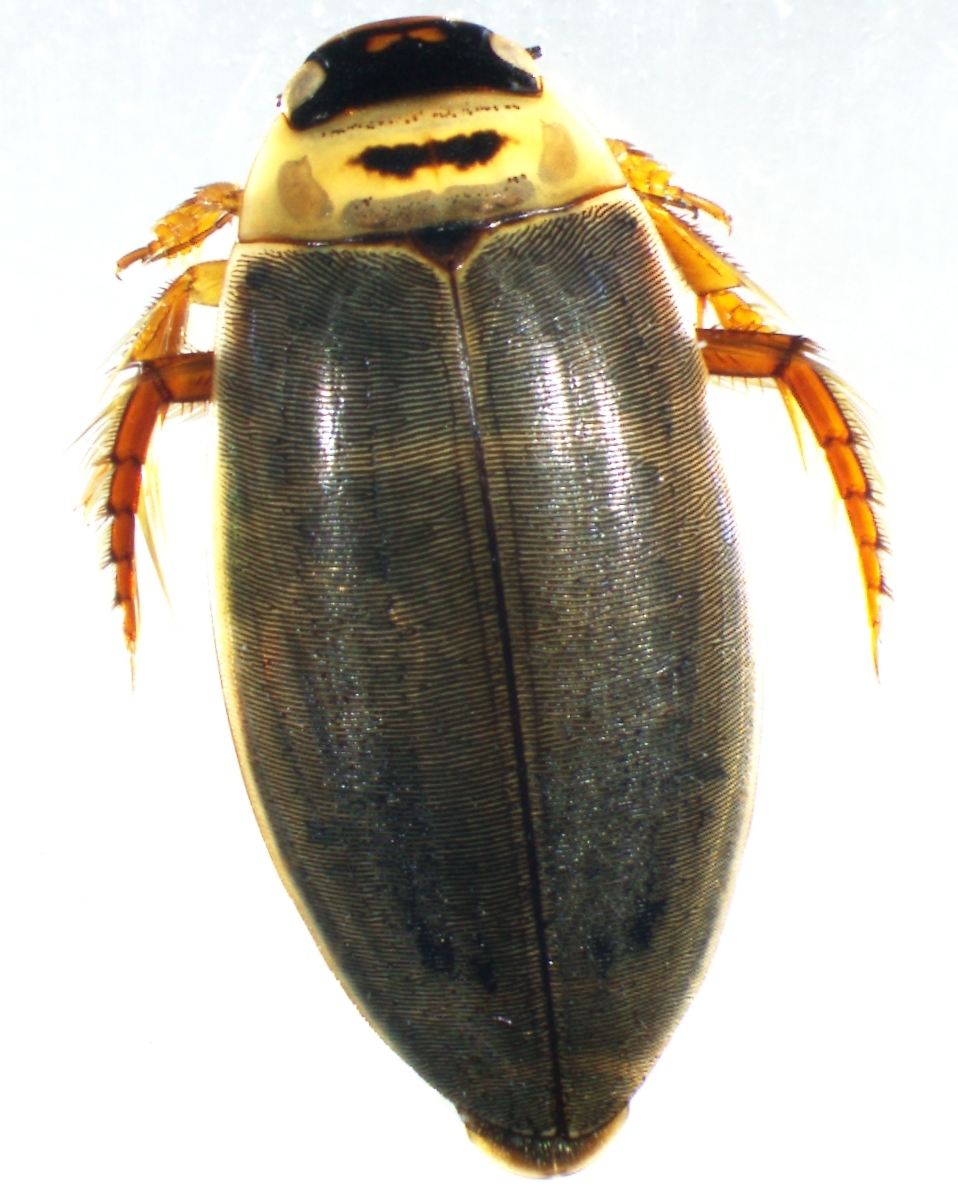

Scientific classification
- Domain: Eukaryota
- Kingdom: Animalia
- Phylum: Arthropoda
- Class: Insecta
- Order: Coleoptera
- Suborder: Adephaga
- Family: Dytiscidae
- Genus: Colymbetes
- Species: C. sculptilis

Binomial name
- Colymbetes sculptilis Harris, 1829

= Colymbetes sculptilis =

Species of beetle

Colymbetes sculptilis is a species of predaceous diving beetle in the family Dytiscidae. It is found in North America.
