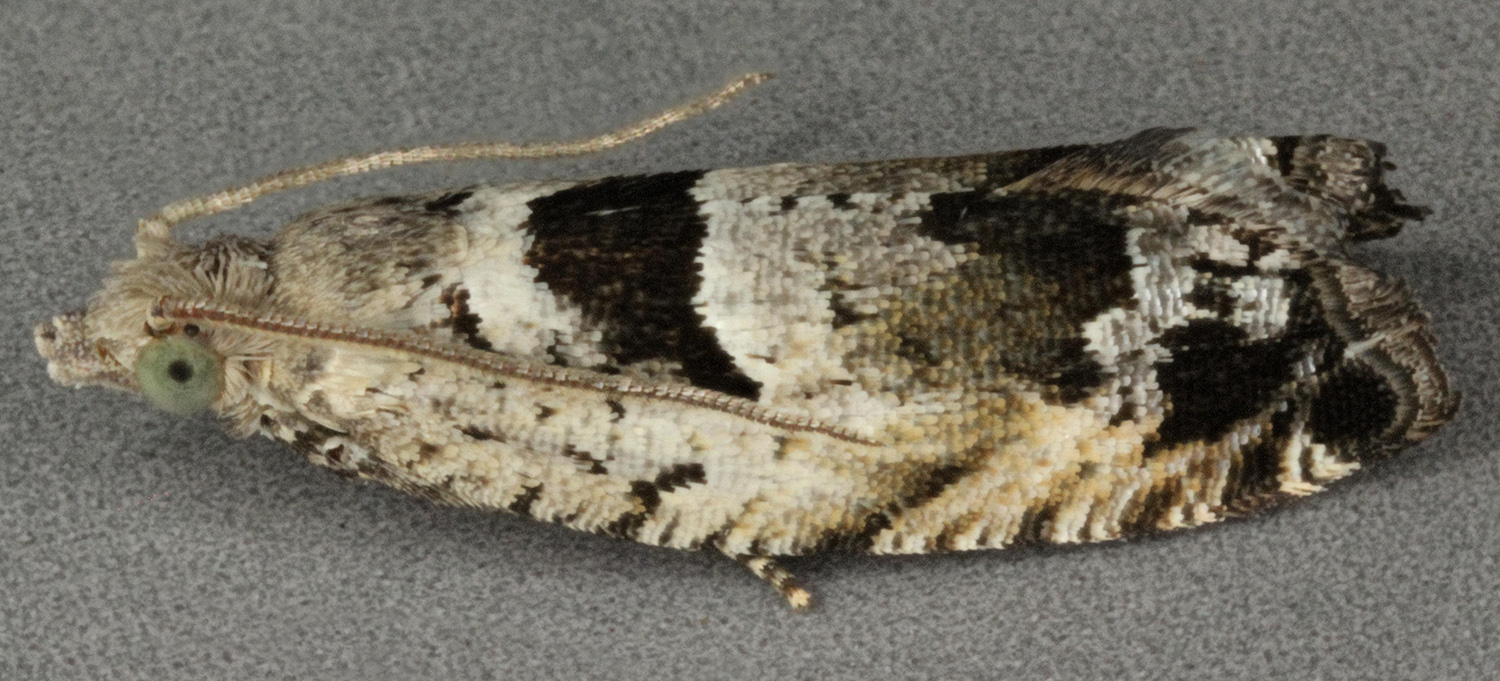

Scientific classification
- Kingdom: Animalia
- Phylum: Arthropoda
- Class: Insecta
- Order: Lepidoptera
- Family: Tortricidae
- Genus: Epinotia
- Species: E. ramella

Binomial name
- Epinotia ramella (Linnaeus, 1758)

Synonyms
- Phalaena (Tinea) ramella Linnaeus, 1758; Grapholitha costana Duponchel, in Godart, 1836; Anchylopera fimbriana Stephens, 1829; Tortrix paykulliana Fabricius, 1787; Tortrix ramana Frolich, 1828; Tortrix sesquilunana Haworth, [1811]

= Epinotia ramella =

Species of moth

Epinotia ramella is a moth of the family Tortricidae, found in countries throughout Eurasia.

== Description ==
The wingspan is 13–16 millimetres (0.51–0.63 in). The forewings are ochreous-white, with some black scales towards base. The is costa greyish-tinged, strigulated with black. There is a triangular black spot mixed with grey on dorsum before middle, and another less defined on the tornus. The central fascia is ill-marked and pale ochreous grey. The apex is suffused with dark grey, the ocellus edged with leaden metallic. Sometimes the dorsal 3/5 of the forewing wholly suffused with blackish-grey. The hindwings are grey.

== Distribution and habitat ==
Epinotia ramella is found in Europe, China (Hebei, Inner Mongolia, Jilin, Heilongjiang, Sichuan, Gansu, Qinghai, Ningxia), Japan, Russia and Kazakhstan.. It lives in well wooded areas that contain the larval food plants.

== Behaviour and ecology ==
The adult moths fly from June to October in Europe.

The larvae mainly feed on the catkins of birch and willow.
