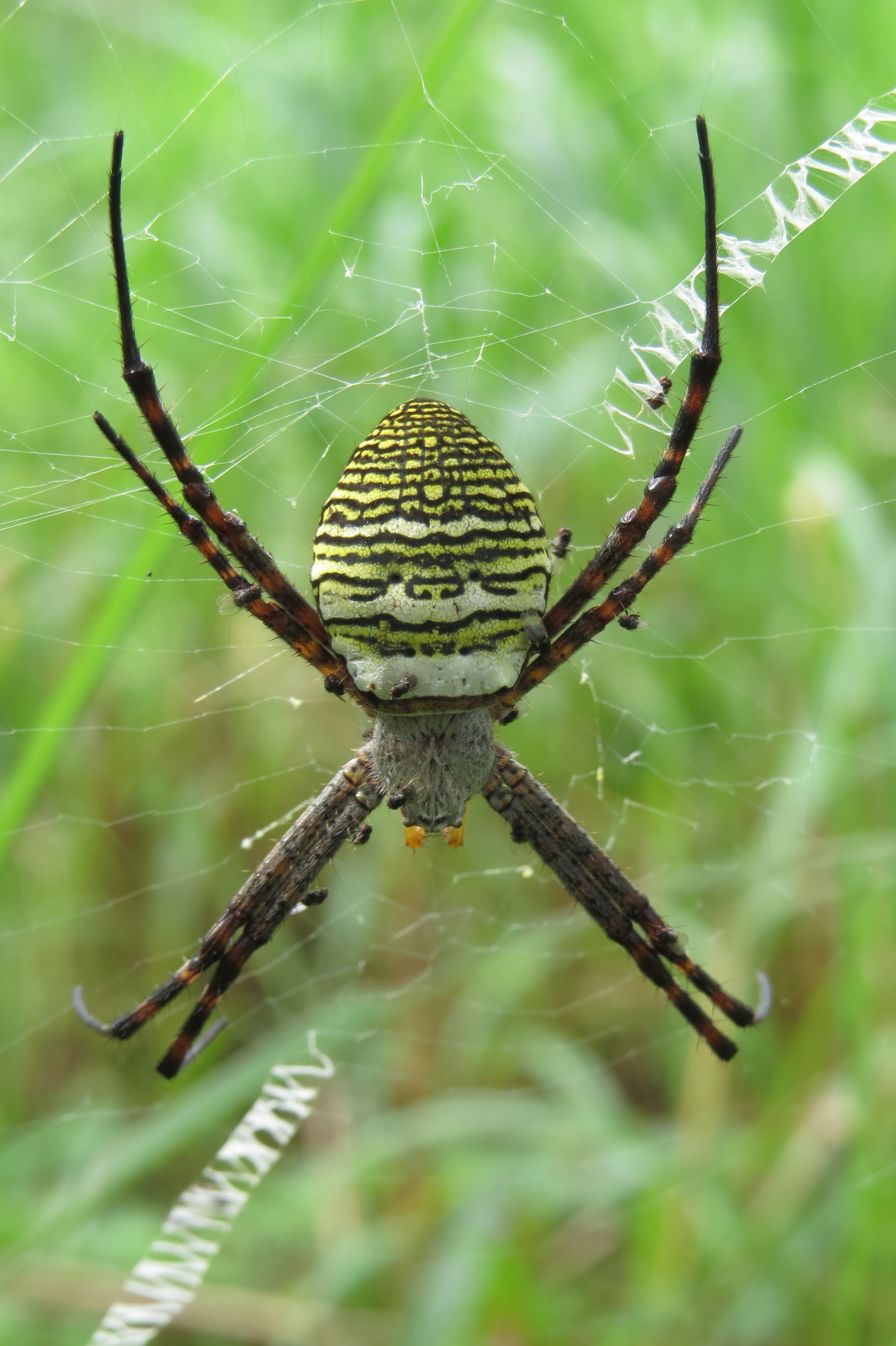
- Female (dorsal)
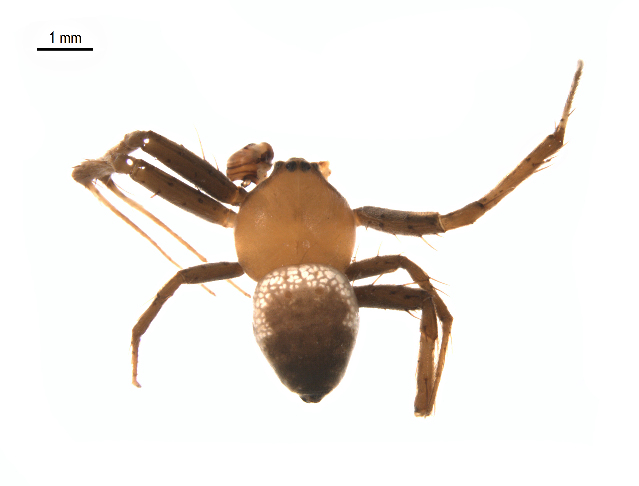
- Male (dorsal)

Scientific classification
- Kingdom: Animalia
- Phylum: Arthropoda
- Subphylum: Chelicerata
- Class: Arachnida
- Order: Araneae
- Infraorder: Araneomorphae
- Family: Araneidae
- Genus: Argiope
- Species: A. aemula

Binomial name
- Argiope aemula (Walckenaer, 1841)

= Argiope aemula =

Oval St Andrew's Cross Spider

Species of spider

Argiope aemula, commonly known as the oval St Andrew's cross spider, is a species of spider in the family Araneidae which is native to southeast Asia, found from India and Sri Lanka to the Philippines, Indonesia, and Vanuatu. It is one of the giant, conspicuous "signature spider" species of the genus Argiope, observed in tropical and subtropical grasslands.

== Taxonomy and naming ==
=== Etymology ===
The term Argiope comes from the Greek Αργιόπη, "silver face" (sharing a common root with the Latin word for silver, argentum), referring to the fact that the spiders in this group have silky silver hairs covering their carapaces.

=== Common and alternate scientific names ===
They are commonly known as the oval St. Andrew's cross spider, which can be confusing because several other Argiope species are also commonly called "St. Andrew's cross spiders". An alternate scientific name for the species is Argiope nigripes.

=== Phylogeny ===
Argiope aemula is part of the Araneidae family. They are in the same genus as common spiders such as Argiope aurantia, or the yellow garden spider, and the Argiope argentata, or the silver Argiope.

== Description ==
The female is larger than male - often reaching 25–30 mm while the male tends to stop growing at 5–8 mm. Its Cephalothorax is brownish with a white pubescence. Its posterior median eyes are encircled in black and its sternum is heart shaped. Further, there is a narrow elongation found at the distal end of sternum. Its oval shaped and anteriorly truncated abdomen is yellowish with black stripes. Its ventrum is brownish with yellow parallel lines.

Argiope aemula has silver hairs on its carapace - hence its namesake. The female spider has a carapace that is flat with yellow and black horizontal lines that are present from the end of the carapace to the entirety of the backside. The spider has eight legs that are doubled up and spread like an X in the web. The legs are long with claw like structures at the end. Their legs have grey color and black rings around them. The cephalothorax is a dirty white color and the sternum is shaped like a heart. There are four yellow dots that are placed in its abdomen and are organized vertically. The females’ exotic color has been speculated to be associated with prey attraction. Males are much less brilliant in their color. Their sternum and backside are brownish while their carapace is black. Both sexes have abdomens that are oval shaped. They are easy to identify thanks to their stabilimentum in their web. Males are 5–8 mm while females are 23–30 mm creating a large size dichotomy.

== Distribution and habitat ==
=== Distribution ===
These spiders are found largely in South East Asian countries such as the Philippines, Malaysia, Singapore, and Thailand. They can also be seen in India, Sri Lanka, China, northern Australia, and southern Japan.

=== Habitat ===
They are found near human settlements and they prefer woodland in sunny locations where there are flowers, shrubby, and plants to give them protection. Vegetation species such as big bidens and giant false sensitive plants are common in their habitat. They tend to have their webs around 1–2 m above the ground.

== Mating ==
When the male arrives at the female's web, he begins courtship. After courtship, the male inserts his palpal bulb into the female. This is known as the first insertion. After the first insertion, the male then jumps away from the female. Some males are eaten before they can escape. If they can successfully escape, the male begins the second insertion. Around half the time, the second insertion is successful while the other half, the male is eaten after the first insertion.

=== Sexual cannibalism ===
In most cases, males are cannibalized when or after they insert their palpal bulb. If males are not cannibalized during the first insertion, they are almost guaranteed to get eaten after the second insertion. In fact, in most cases, males lie motionless after completing the second insertion, possibly dying or having died. This contrast with how after the first insertion, males aggressively resist cannibalism. These observations have led to the theory that males welcome sexual cannibalism after the second insertion. Sexual cannibalism may be favored by natural selection as it provides resources to the female. This can improve the reproductive success of the female and therefore help the males' genes be passed on. Sexual cannibalism is most likely to occur if the male only mates once in his lifetime. Even when males survive the second insertion, they often die the following day, indicating that being cannibalized may be part of their natural behavior.

== Behavior ==
=== Size-affected behavior ===
When the spiders are less than 23 mm, they build discoid decorations. When they get larger than 23 mm, they tend to build cruciate decorations. Furthermore, mature Argiope aemula that are less than 10 mm long build webs deep inside the vegetation rather than out in the open. This is likely due to the fact that they require extra protection due to their size.

=== Hunting and predation ===
==== Prey capture ====
The most likely hypothesis for the web decorations are for prey capture. Studies have suggested that the greater the capture area and the less visible the webs, the greater the capture success rate. Generally, the smallest sized web is around 2 m^{2}. In general, the decorated webs are 60% more likely to capture prey than undecorated webs. Some of the prey for the spider includes Hymenoptera (e.g. wasps and ants), Diptera (flies), and Orthoptera (e.g. grasshoppers and crickets). Furthermore, decorated webs with spiders on the webs catch much more prey than decorated webs without spiders. Decorated webs without spiders, however, still catch more prey than webs without decorations. Web decorations have been suggested to mimic the pattern of pollen resources that prey insects are attracted to. In some cases, prey have been known to associate decorations with the spiders and avoid them. This is especially true if they have been caught in the web before (and were able to escape), as the prey will know that the decorations are a trap. However, because there are much more pollen resources than spider decorations, most prey will associate the decorations with food rather than a predator. When comparing the ultraviolet radiating pattern of the decorated webs and the pollen resources, they exhibited similar patterns indicating why prey can be confused. Furthermore, the design on the bodies of the spiders also serve as a lure. The prey of these spiders prefer patterns that are both symmetric and disrupted. These spiders have patterns that match this criterion. They have symmetric horizontal black and yellow lines with disrupted patterns on their legs. This attractive pattern and the lure of the decorated webs are most likely why decorated webs with spiders on them caught the most prey.

==== Predation risk ====
Medium spiders are at most risk for predation. In an experiment with mud dauber wasps, the predator of Argiope aemula, they chose only a specific range of female spiders, 24–27 mm, to eat. In an experiment that measured predator attacks, almost all of the attacks were on medium-sized spiders whilst only one out of 18 was on a large spider. It has been suggested that wasps use the cruciate decorations as an indicator for the location of the spiders.

==== Trade off between prey capture and predation risk ====
There exists a tradeoff between prey capture and predation risk. Decorated webs capture much more prey but also increase the risk of predation. Interestingly, despite being targeted the most, medium-sized spiders had the greatest frequency for building decorations. This could be attributed to a strategy for medium-sized spiders. The strategy is that they are willing to take the risk of being predated in return for the increased capture success that they get using decorated webs. This is so that they can quickly become a large spider and grow out of being the vulnerable medium size. Therefore, there are two selection pressures going against each other. One selection pressure causes them to create brilliantly decorated webs as they attract more prey and allow them to grow out of the venerable size. However, another selection pressure suggests them to stop building decorated webs as they attract predators. Therefore, the genetic and physiological status of the spiders often sway this decision into one way or another. The genetic component of this is particularly evident in the fact that the amount of silk reserve in the spiders’ silk glands vary from spider to spider. This quantity of available silk may influence the amount of silk they can produce and therefore the size of their webs.

=== Web design ===
==== Web decoration ====
A majority of orb web spiders, including Argiope aemula, have decorated webs otherwise known as stabilimentum. The spiders generally tend to use eggs, waste, or prey to create their decorations. In some cases, the decorations are entirely made of the spider's silk. The purpose of the decorations are not exactly clear, although they have been speculated to serve purposes such as prey capture or camouflage against predators. However, recent studies have indicated that when viewed against the background vegetation, the decorations are highly visible showing that it may not serve as camouflage. Furthermore, these studies have suggested that the silk decorations can actually attract predators. The study conducted showed that when the spiders’ predator, praying mantids, were placed in a cage, they chose decorated webs more often than undecorated webs. An interesting observation was that in the presence of predators, these spiders reduced the size and building frequency of the webs. On the other hand, a study showed that blue jays attacked spiders with decorated webs less often. This could be due to the fact that the blue jays have learnt not attack webs as they are sticky and have associated the stickiness with the decorations.

==== Adjustment of web decoration ====
Argiope aemula are able to understand its environment, forecast its potential prey accordingly, and adjust web decorations to fit the prey that they are anticipating. For example, when there are only small prey in the area, the spiders will build narrow mesh like webs to capture these small prey. They also made the height of their webs lower. Furthermore, starved spiders were much more likely to build larger webs than well-fed spiders. Not only did starved spiders build larger webs, they also increased their capture area. This adjustment capability illustrates the fact that these spiders are able to observe its surroundings and make rationalized decisions based on the given input. The starved spiders also made the mesh in the webs narrower. This is likely due to the fact that they were unable to tell the size of the prey and therefore made it the smallest it could to be able to capture any prey. Spiders also adjusted the distance between sticky spirals. Starved spiders created spirals with smaller distances between each other likely to be able to capture more prey. Finally, spiders also created more spiral turns whilst reducing the distance between each turn. This was done so likely because increased spiral turns meant greater capture area, but it also meant more resources expended. Therefore, by reducing the distance between each spiral turn, the spiders were able to create greater capture area whilst expending as little energy as possible.

== Ecology ==
Signature spiders get their name from the zigzag design embossed on the web, the stabilimentum, that is believed to serve a camouflage function. They show extreme sexual dimorphism and males are only 10% of the female in size and as a result become victims of sexual cannibalism. If the males survive the first copulation, then they almost always die during the second attempt. However, further studies have shown that male invariably dies after second copulation as a form of programmed suicide.

== Venom ==
Argiope aemula have venom. However, the venom of these spiders are not a serious threat to humans. Their venom contains polyamine toxins that are sometimes used against prey if they are still alive. When humans get bit, there is some swelling although no medical attention is needed.
