= Aeranthes aemula =

Conservation status
- CITES Appendix II

Scientific classification
- Kingdom: Plantae
- Clade: Tracheophytes
- Clade: Angiosperms
- Clade: Monocots
- Order: Asparagales
- Family: Orchidaceae
- Subfamily: Epidendroideae
- Genus: Aeranthes
- Species: A. aemula

Binomial name
- Aeranthes aemula Schltr.

Synonyms
- Aeranthes biauriculata H.Perrier

Species of orchid

Aeranthes aemula is a species of orchid native to Madagascar.
