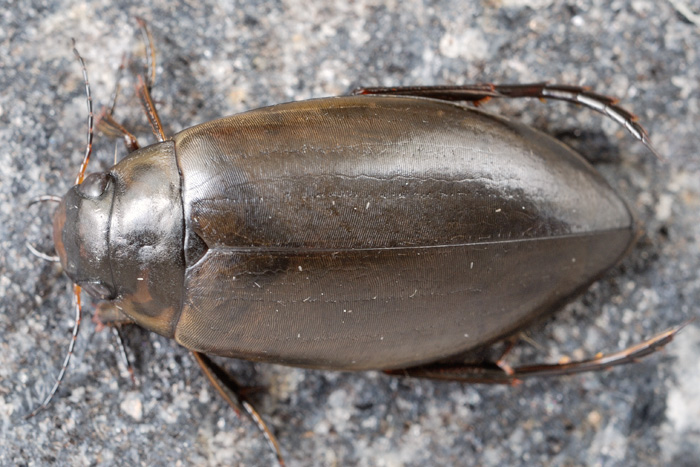

Scientific classification
- Domain: Eukaryota
- Kingdom: Animalia
- Phylum: Arthropoda
- Class: Insecta
- Order: Coleoptera
- Suborder: Adephaga
- Family: Dytiscidae
- Genus: Colymbetes
- Species: C. paykulli

Binomial name
- Colymbetes paykulli Erichson, 1837

Synonyms
- Colymbetes longulus LeConte, 1862

= Colymbetes paykulli =

Species of beetle

Colymbetes paykulli is a species of predaceous diving beetle in the family Dytiscidae. It is found in North America and the Palearctic.
