= Sven Ingemar Ljungh =

Swedish civil servant, naturalist and collector of insects

Sven Ingemar Ljungh, also spelled Liungh (5 June 1757, Björkö, Jönköping County – 12 September 1828, Bälaryd, Jönköping County) was a Swedish civil servant, naturalist and collector of insects.

== Biography ==
Ljungh was born on Björkö Prestgård in Småland to provost and priest Sven Ljlungh and Brigitta Oxelgren. He was educated at home until 1770 before studies under the lexicographer Håkan Sjögren from whom he learned the Latin language. He then joined the Gymnasium in Växjö in 1773, where he received a good education in botany. He went to the University of Uppsala in 1774, graduating in 1777 with a degree in theology. He attended the classes of Linnaeus the younger and even joined on a trip to Lapland in 1776. He then started to study medicine but fell ill to malaria. After recovery he joined the civil services. He took up a position in the Swedish civil service as a clerk in the judicial system and in 1778 became the Deputy Crown Bailiff in North and South Vedbo.

He was a scholar who exchanged correspondence with many contemporary scientists including Carl Thunberg, G Marklin, Erik Acharius, Fr Ehrhart, Jan Brandes and others. As a collector of rodents, insects, birds and molluscs, he described many new species. He became a Fellow of the Patriotic Society, 1806, a member of the Royal Swedish Academy of Sciences, 1808 and member of the Royal Society of Sciences and Letters in Gothenburg in 1808. He also worked on agriculture and meteorology and for his work on the former received the Order of Vasa.

In 1803 his insect collection had an estimated 5000-6000 species and he published many notes on exotic animals from Java, Ceylon and the Cape. After his death, none of his sons took an interest in natural history and his collections were sold.
