= Freraea montana =

Scientific classification
- Kingdom: Animalia
- Phylum: Arthropoda
- Class: Insecta
- Order: Diptera
- Family: Tachinidae
- Subfamily: Dexiinae
- Tribe: Freraeini
- Genus: Freraea
- Species: F. montana

Binomial name
- Freraea montana (Coquillett, 1897)

Synonyms
- Gymnophania montana Coquillett, 1897

Species of fly

Freraea montana is a species of bristle fly in the family Tachinidae. It is a parasite of pupal Amara quenseli beetles.

== Distribution ==
Canada, United States.
