= Freraea gagatea =

Scientific classification
- Kingdom: Animalia
- Phylum: Arthropoda
- Class: Insecta
- Order: Diptera
- Family: Tachinidae
- Subfamily: Dexiinae
- Tribe: Freraeini
- Genus: Freraea
- Species: F. gagatea

Binomial name
- Freraea gagatea Robineau-Desvoidy, 1830

Synonyms
- Gymnopeza albipennis Zetterstedt, 1838; Gymnopeza denudata Zetterstedt, 1844; Gymnophania nigripennis Brauer & von Berganstamm, 1889

Species of fly

Freraea gagatea is a species of fly in the family Tachinidae.

== Distribution ==
British Isles, Czech Republic, Hungary, Moldova, Poland, Romania, Slovakia, Denmark, Finland, Norway, Sweden, Bulgaria, Italy, Spain, Austria, Belgium, France, Germany, Netherlands, Switzerland, Iran, Mongolia, Russia.
