= Freraea =

Scientific classification
- Kingdom: Animalia
- Phylum: Arthropoda
- Class: Insecta
- Order: Diptera
- Family: Tachinidae
- Subfamily: Dexiinae
- Tribe: Freraeini
- Genus: Freraea; Robineau-Desvoidy, 1830

Type species
- Freraea gagatea Robineau-Desvoidy, 1830

Synonyms
- Eugymnogaster Townsend, 1931; Frerea Desmarest In D’Orbigny, 1849; Gymnopeza Zetterstedt, 1838; Gymnozega Townsend, 1891; Gymnophania Brauer & von Bergenstamm, 1889; Gymnogaster Townsend, 1926

Genus of flies

Freraea is a genus of bristle flies in the family Tachinidae.

== Species ==
- Freraea gagatea Robineau-Desvoidy, 1830
- Freraea montana (Coquillett, 1897)
