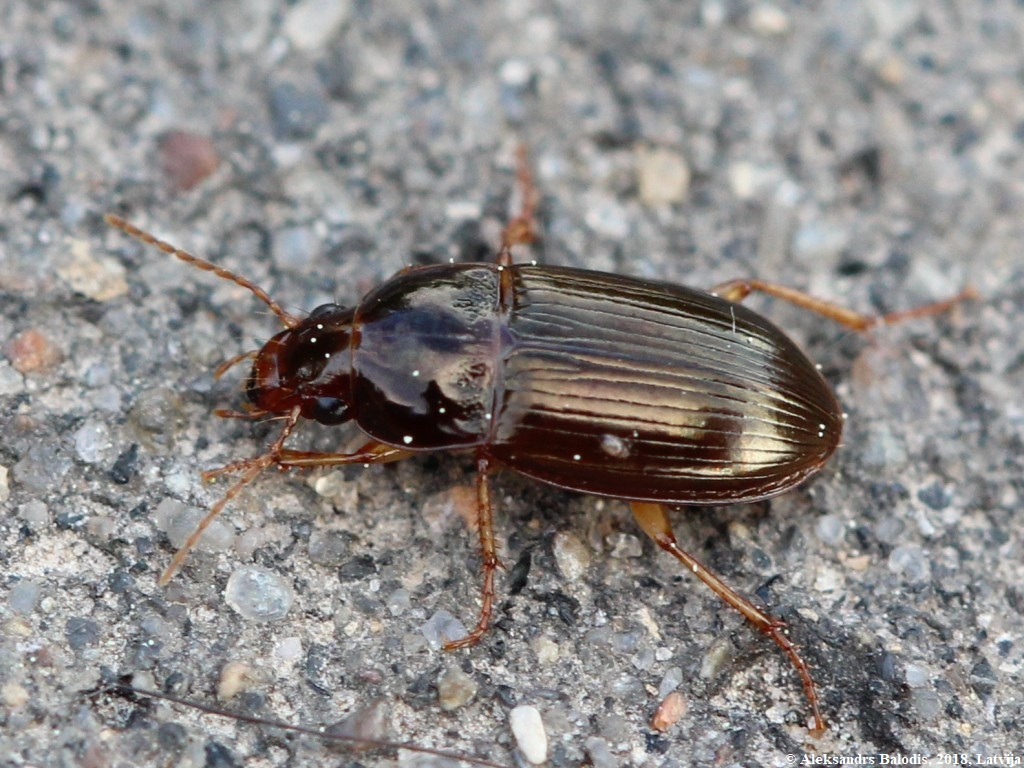

Scientific classification
- Kingdom: Animalia
- Phylum: Arthropoda
- Class: Insecta
- Order: Coleoptera
- Suborder: Adephaga
- Family: Carabidae
- Genus: Amara
- Species: A. quenseli

Binomial name
- Amara quenseli (Schonherr, 1806)

Synonyms
- Amara horni Csiki, 1929; Amara purpurascens (Motschulsky, 1859)

= Amara quenseli =

Species of beetle

Amara quenseli is a species of seed-eating ground beetle in the family Carabidae. It is found in Europe and Northern Asia (excluding China) and North America.

== Subspecies ==
These two subspecies belong to the species Amara quenseli:

- Amara quenseli quenseli (Schönherr, 1806)^{i c g}
- Amara quenseli silvicola Zimmermann, 1832^{c g}

Data sources: i = ITIS, c = Catalogue of Life, g = GBIF, b = Bugguide.net
