= Freraeini =

Scientific classification
- Domain: Eukaryota
- Kingdom: Animalia
- Phylum: Arthropoda
- Class: Insecta
- Order: Diptera
- Family: Tachinidae
- Subfamily: Dexiinae
- Tribe: Freraeini; Townsend, 1936

Tribe of flies

Freraeini is a tribe of flies in the family Tachinidae.

== Genera ==
- Freraea Robineau-Desvoidy, 1830
