= Dorcadion tebrisicum =

Scientific classification
- Kingdom: Animalia
- Phylum: Arthropoda
- Clade: Pancrustacea
- Class: Insecta
- Order: Coleoptera
- Suborder: Polyphaga
- Infraorder: Cucujiformia
- Family: Cerambycidae
- Genus: Dorcadion
- Species: D. tebrisicum

Binomial name
- Dorcadion tebrisicum Plavilstshikov, 1951

Species of beetle

Dorcadion tebrisicum is a species of beetle in the family Cerambycidae. It was described by Plavilstshikov in 1951. It is known from Iran.
