= Dorcadion gallipolitanum =

Scientific classification
- Kingdom: Animalia
- Phylum: Arthropoda
- Clade: Pancrustacea
- Class: Insecta
- Order: Coleoptera
- Suborder: Polyphaga
- Infraorder: Cucujiformia
- Family: Cerambycidae
- Genus: Dorcadion
- Species: D. gallipolitanum

Binomial name
- Dorcadion gallipolitanum Thomson, 1876

Synonyms
- Dorcadion sutura-alba Desbrochers, 1870; Pedestredorcadion gallipolitanum (Thomson) Sama, 2002

Species of beetle

Dorcadion gallipolitanum is a species of beetle in the family Cerambycidae. It was described by Thomson in 1876. It is known from Greece and Turkey.

== Subspecies ==
- Dorcadion gallipolitanum atritarse Pic, 1931
- Dorcadion gallipolitanum fumidum Pesarini & Sabbadini, 2010
- Dorcadion gallipolitanum gallipolitanum Thomson, 1876
- Dorcadion gallipolitanum samothrakieanum Breuning, 1962
