= Dorcadion indutum =

Scientific classification
- Kingdom: Animalia
- Phylum: Arthropoda
- Clade: Pancrustacea
- Class: Insecta
- Order: Coleoptera
- Suborder: Polyphaga
- Infraorder: Cucujiformia
- Family: Cerambycidae
- Genus: Dorcadion
- Species: D. indutum

Binomial name
- Dorcadion indutum Faldermann, 1837

Species of beetle

Dorcadion indutum is a species of beetle in the family Cerambycidae. It was described by Faldermann in 1837.

== Subspecies ==
- Dorcadion indutum indutum Faldermann, 1837
- Dorcadion indutum nigrosuturatum Reitter, 1897
