= Dorcadion ariannae =

Scientific classification
- Kingdom: Animalia
- Phylum: Arthropoda
- Clade: Pancrustacea
- Class: Insecta
- Order: Coleoptera
- Suborder: Polyphaga
- Infraorder: Cucujiformia
- Family: Cerambycidae
- Genus: Dorcadion
- Species: D. ariannae

Binomial name
- Dorcadion ariannae Pesarini & Sabbadini, 2008

Species of beetle

Dorcadion ariannae is a species of beetle in the family Cerambycidae. It was described by Pesarini and Sabbadini in 2008. It is known from Greece.
