= Dorcadion gorbunovi =

Scientific classification
- Kingdom: Animalia
- Phylum: Arthropoda
- Clade: Pancrustacea
- Class: Insecta
- Order: Coleoptera
- Suborder: Polyphaga
- Infraorder: Cucujiformia
- Family: Cerambycidae
- Genus: Dorcadion
- Species: D. gorbunovi

Binomial name
- Dorcadion gorbunovi Danilevsky, 1985

Species of beetle

Dorcadion gorbunovi is a species of beetle in the family Cerambycidae. It was described by Mikhail Leontievich Danilevsky in 1985. It is known from Armenia and Azerbaijan.

== Subspecies ==
- Dorcadion gorbunovi gorbunovi Danilevsky, 1985
- Dorcadion gorbunovi rubenyani Lazarev, 2014
