= Dorcadion regulare =

Scientific classification
- Kingdom: Animalia
- Phylum: Arthropoda
- Clade: Pancrustacea
- Class: Insecta
- Order: Coleoptera
- Suborder: Polyphaga
- Infraorder: Cucujiformia
- Family: Cerambycidae
- Genus: Dorcadion
- Species: D. regulare

Binomial name
- Dorcadion regulare Pic, 1931

Synonyms
- Dorcadion gallipolitanum var. regulare Pic, 1931; Pedestredorcadion regulare (Pic, 1931)

Species of beetle

Dorcadion regulare is a species of beetle in the family Cerambycidae. It was described by Maurice Pic in 1931. It is known from Bulgaria, Turkey and Greece.

== Subspecies ==
- Dorcadion regulare dramaticum Pesarini & Sabbadini, 2010
- Dorcadion regulare regulare Pic, 1931
- Dorcadion regulare sapkaianum Kretschmer, 1987
