= Dorcadion valonense =

Scientific classification
- Kingdom: Animalia
- Phylum: Arthropoda
- Clade: Pancrustacea
- Class: Insecta
- Order: Coleoptera
- Suborder: Polyphaga
- Infraorder: Cucujiformia
- Family: Cerambycidae
- Genus: Dorcadion
- Species: D. valonense

Binomial name
- Dorcadion valonense Pic, 1917

Synonyms
- Pedestredorcadion valonense (Pic, 1917)

Species of beetle

Dorcadion valonense is a species of beetle in the family Cerambycidae. It was described by Maurice Pic in 1917. It is known from Albania.
