= Dorcadion theophilei =

Scientific classification
- Kingdom: Animalia
- Phylum: Arthropoda
- Clade: Pancrustacea
- Class: Insecta
- Order: Coleoptera
- Suborder: Polyphaga
- Infraorder: Cucujiformia
- Family: Cerambycidae
- Genus: Dorcadion
- Species: D. theophilei

Binomial name
- Dorcadion theophilei Pic, 1898

Synonyms
- Dorcadion costiferum Pic, 1898

Species of beetle

Dorcadion theophilei is a species of beetle in the family Cerambycidae. It was described by Maurice Pic in 1898. It is known from Turkey.
