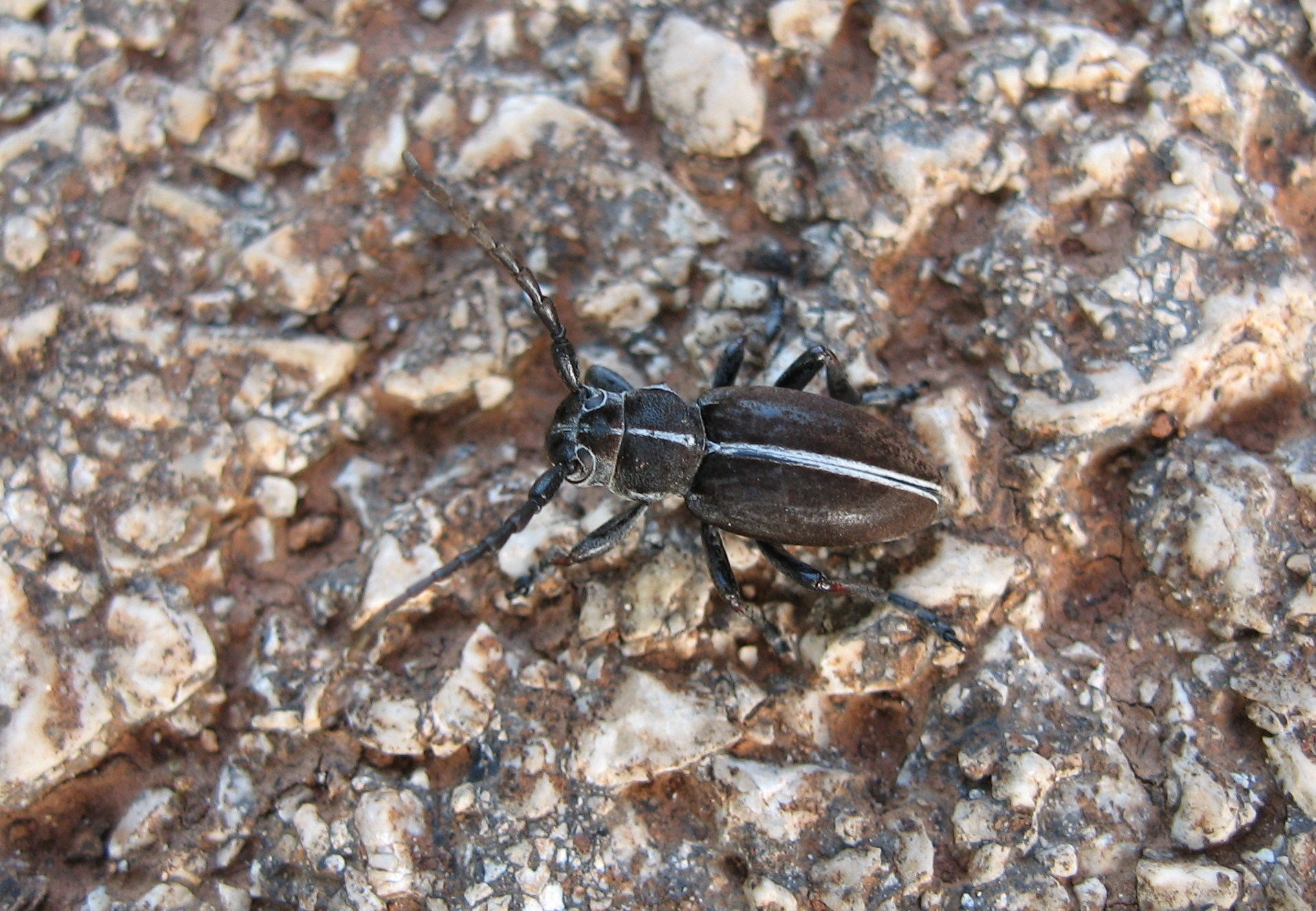

Scientific classification
- Kingdom: Animalia
- Phylum: Arthropoda
- Clade: Pancrustacea
- Class: Insecta
- Order: Coleoptera
- Suborder: Polyphaga
- Infraorder: Cucujiformia
- Family: Cerambycidae
- Genus: Dorcadion
- Species: D. arenarium

Binomial name
- Dorcadion arenarium (Scopoli, 1763)

Synonyms
- Cerambyx pedestris Linnaeus, 1767; Pedestredorcadion arenarium (Scopoli, 1763)

= Dorcadion arenarium =

Species of beetle

Dorcadion arenarium is a species of beetle in the family Cerambycidae. It was described by Giovanni Antonio Scopoli in 1763. It is known from Italy, Albania, Austria, France, Croatia, Bosnia and Herzegovina, Slovenia, and Montenegro.

== Subspecies ==
- Dorcadion arenarium abruptum Germar, 1839
- Dorcadion arenarium arenarium (Scopoli, 1763)
- Dorcadion arenarium rubripes Müller, 1905
- Dorcadion arenarium skypetarum Heyrovský, 1937
- Dorcadion arenarium subcarinatum Müller, 1905
