= Dorcadion danczenkoi =

Scientific classification
- Kingdom: Animalia
- Phylum: Arthropoda
- Clade: Pancrustacea
- Class: Insecta
- Order: Coleoptera
- Suborder: Polyphaga
- Infraorder: Cucujiformia
- Family: Cerambycidae
- Genus: Dorcadion
- Species: D. danczenkoi

Binomial name
- Dorcadion danczenkoi Danilevsky, 1996

Synonyms
- Dorcadion cinerarium danczenkoi Danilevsky, 1996

Species of beetle

Dorcadion danczenkoi is a species of beetle in the family Cerambycidae. It was described by Mikhail Leontievich Danilevsky in 1996. It is known from Afghanistan, Azerbaijan, and Iran.
