= Dorcadion ardahense =

Scientific classification
- Kingdom: Animalia
- Phylum: Arthropoda
- Clade: Pancrustacea
- Class: Insecta
- Order: Coleoptera
- Suborder: Polyphaga
- Infraorder: Cucujiformia
- Family: Cerambycidae
- Genus: Dorcadion
- Species: D. ardahense

Binomial name
- Dorcadion ardahense Breuning, 1975

Species of beetle

Dorcadion ardahense is a species of beetle in the family Cerambycidae. It was described by Stephan von Breuning in 1975.
