= Dorcadion eurygyne =

Scientific classification
- Kingdom: Animalia
- Phylum: Arthropoda
- Clade: Pancrustacea
- Class: Insecta
- Order: Coleoptera
- Suborder: Polyphaga
- Infraorder: Cucujiformia
- Family: Cerambycidae
- Genus: Dorcadion
- Species: D. eurygyne

Binomial name
- Dorcadion eurygyne Suvorov, 1911

Synonyms
- Politodorcadion eurygyne (Suvorov, 1911)

Species of beetle

Dorcadion eurygyne is a species of beetle in the family Cerambycidae. It was described by Suvorov in 1911.

== See also ==
Dorcadion
