= Dorcadion albolineatum =

Scientific classification
- Kingdom: Animalia
- Phylum: Arthropoda
- Clade: Pancrustacea
- Class: Insecta
- Order: Coleoptera
- Suborder: Polyphaga
- Infraorder: Cucujiformia
- Family: Cerambycidae
- Genus: Dorcadion
- Species: D. albolineatum

Binomial name
- Dorcadion albolineatum Küster, 1847

Synonyms
- Dorcadion byzantinum Kraatz, 1869

Species of beetle

Dorcadion albolineatum is a species of beetle in the family Cerambycidae. It was described by Küster in 1847.
