= Dorcadion infernale =

Scientific classification
- Kingdom: Animalia
- Phylum: Arthropoda
- Clade: Pancrustacea
- Class: Insecta
- Order: Coleoptera
- Suborder: Polyphaga
- Infraorder: Cucujiformia
- Family: Cerambycidae
- Genus: Dorcadion
- Species: D. infernale

Binomial name
- Dorcadion infernale Mulsant & Rey, 1863

Synonyms
- Dorcadion rugosum Thomson, 1867

Species of beetle

Dorcadion infernale is a species of beetle in the family Cerambycidae. It was described by Mulsant and Rey in 1863. It is known from Turkey.

== Subspecies ==
- Dorcadion infernale adremitense Breuning, 1966
- Dorcadion infernale asperatum Breuning, 1947
- Dorcadion infernale infernale Mulsant & Rey, 1863
