= Dorcadion rolandmenradi =

Scientific classification
- Kingdom: Animalia
- Phylum: Arthropoda
- Clade: Pancrustacea
- Class: Insecta
- Order: Coleoptera
- Suborder: Polyphaga
- Infraorder: Cucujiformia
- Family: Cerambycidae
- Genus: Dorcadion
- Species: D. rolandmenradi

Binomial name
- Dorcadion rolandmenradi Peks, 1992

Species of beetle

Dorcadion rolandmenradi is a species of beetle in the family Cerambycidae. It was described by Peks in 1992. It is known from Turkey.
