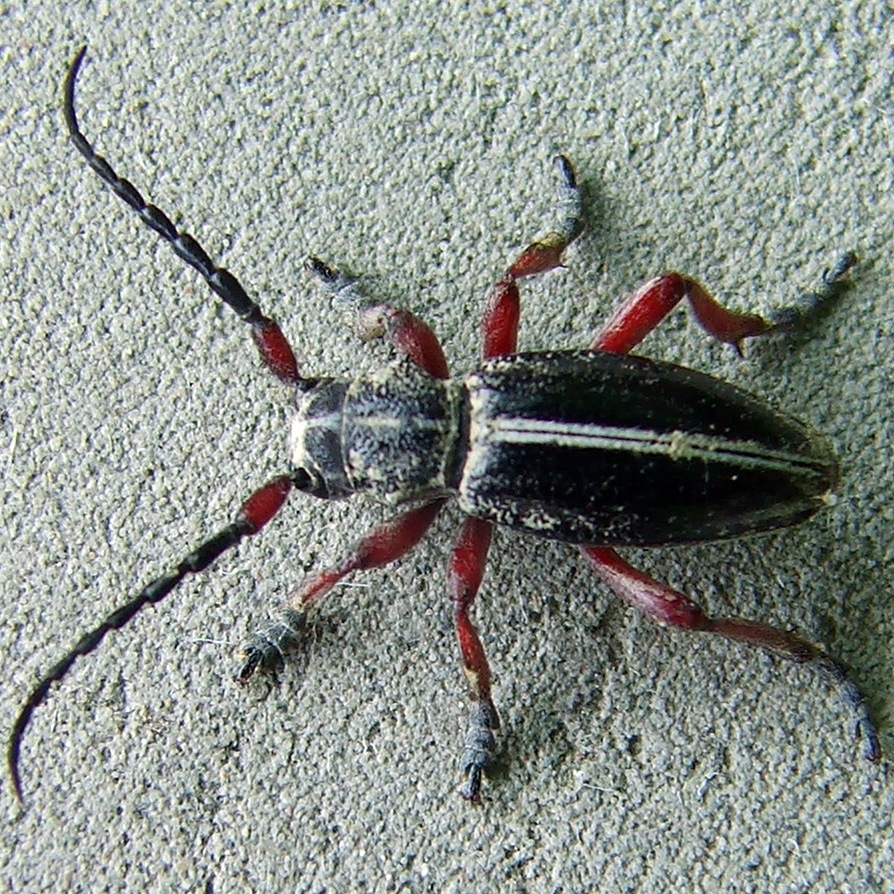
- Dorcadion pedestre

Scientific classification
- Kingdom: Animalia
- Phylum: Arthropoda
- Clade: Pancrustacea
- Class: Insecta
- Order: Coleoptera
- Suborder: Polyphaga
- Infraorder: Cucujiformia
- Family: Cerambycidae
- Subfamily: Lamiinae
- Tribe: Dorcadiini
- Genus: Dorcadion; Dalman, 1817

Species
- Many; see text

Synonyms
- Dorcadium Billberg, 1818 (Lapsus calami)

= Dorcadion =

Genus of beetles

Dorcadion is a genus of longhorn beetles of the subfamily Lamiinae.

This genus of beetles is found distributed across Europe, most living in either Czech Republic, Slovakia and Hungary. This genus also has significant populations in Ukraine, and additional populations live in Russia, Kazakhstan and China.

== Species ==
Dorcadion includes the following species and subgenera. Iberodorcadion was formerly a subgenus of Dorcadion, but has been elevated in rank to genus.

=== subgenus Acutodorcadion ===
- Dorcadion absinthium Plavilstshikov, 1937
- Dorcadion acutispinum Motschulsky, 1860
- Dorcadion alexandris Pic, 1900
- Dorcadion arietinum Jakovlev, 1897
- Dorcadion danilevskyi Dolin & Ovtschinikov, 1999
- Dorcadion darjae Danilevsky, 2001
- Dorcadion globithorax Jakovlev, 1895
- Dorcadion grande Jakovlev, 1906
- Dorcadion irinae Danilevsky, 1997
- Dorcadion kapchagaicum Danilevsky, 1996
- Dorcadion kastekum Danilevsky, 1996
- Dorcadion leopardinum Plavilstshikov, 1937
- Dorcadion mystacinum Ballion, 1878
- Dorcadion nikolaevi Danilevsky, 1995
- Dorcadion ninae Danilevsky, 1995
- Dorcadion nivosum Suvorov, 1913
- Dorcadion optatum Jakovlev, 1906
- Dorcadion pantherinum Jakovlev, 1900
- Dorcadion pelidnum Jakovlev, 1906
- Dorcadion phenax Jakovlev, 1899
- Dorcadion profanifuga Plavilstshikov, 1951
- Dorcadion songaricum Ganglbauer, 1883
- Dorcadion suvorovi Jakovlev, 1906
- Dorcadion suvorovianum Plavilstshikov, 1916
- Dorcadion tianshanskii Suvorov, 1910
- Dorcadion tibiale Jakovlev, 1890
- Dorcadion toropovi Danilevsky, 1999
- Dorcadion tschitscherini Jakovlev, 1900
- Dorcadion unidiscale Danilevsky, 1996
- Dorcadion urdzharicum Plavilstshikov, 1937

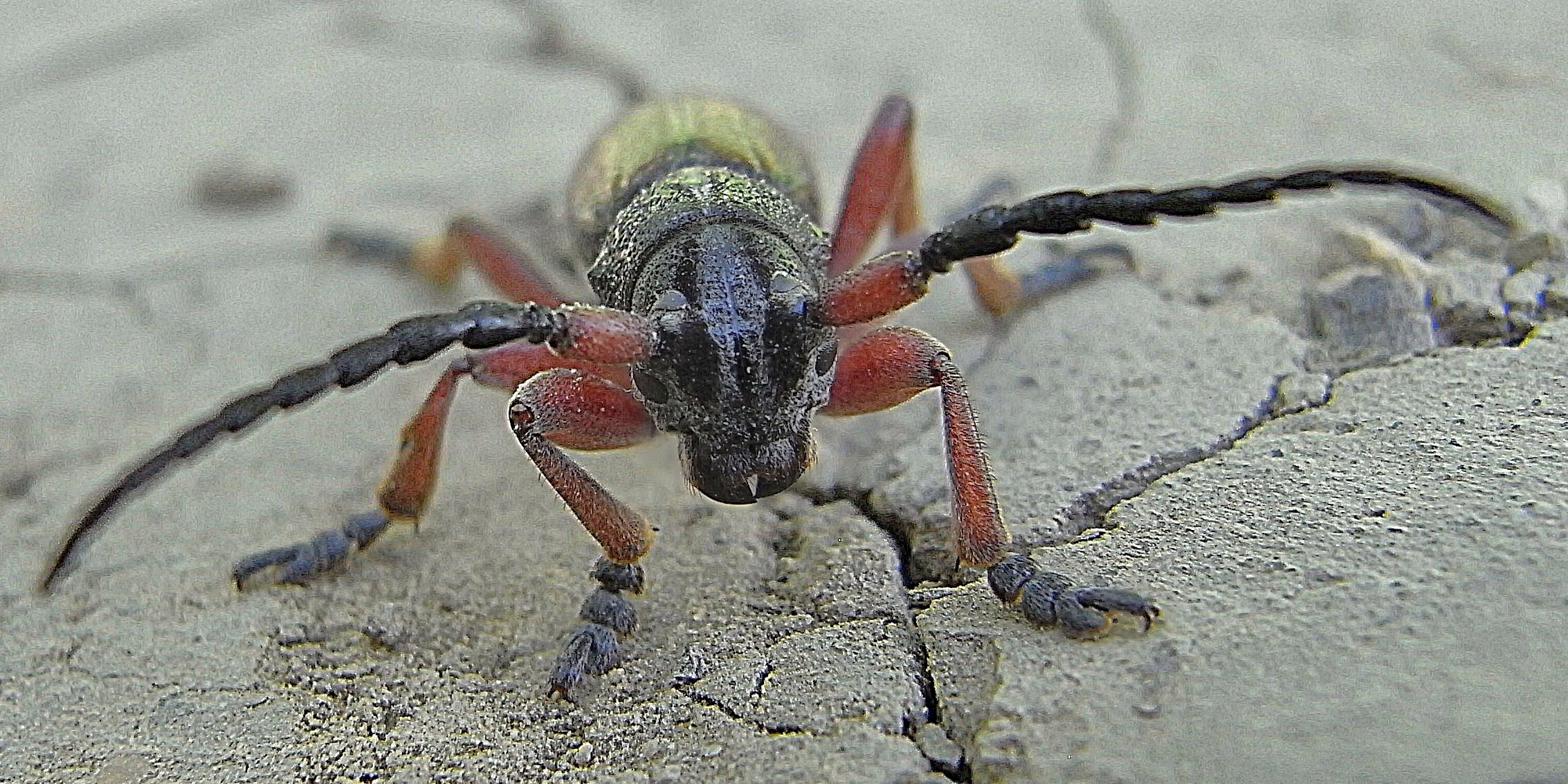
Close up of Dorcadion fulvum

=== subgenus Carinatodorcadion ===
- Dorcadion aethiops (Scopoli, 1763)
- Dorcadion balthasari Heyrovsky, 1962
- Dorcadion carinatum (Pallas, 1771)
- Dorcadion cervae Frivaldszky, 1892
- Dorcadion fulvum (Scopoli, 1763)
- Dorcadion hybridum Ganglbauer, 1883
- Dorcadion ingeae Peks, 1993
- Dorcadion klavdiae Danilevsky, 1992
- Dorcadion laevepunctatum Breuning, 1944
- Dorcadion maderi Breit, 1923
- Dorcadion sterbai Breuning, 1944

=== subgenus Cribridorcadion ===
- Dorcadion abstersum Holzschuh, 1982
- Dorcadion accola Heyden, 1894
- Dorcadion afflictum Pesarini & Sabbadini, 1998
- Dorcadion akpinarense Bernhauer & Peks, 2010
- Dorcadion albanicum Heyrovsky, 1934
- Dorcadion albolineatum Küster, 1847
- Dorcadion albonotatum Pic, 1895
- Dorcadion amanense Breuning, 1943
- Dorcadion anatolicum Pic, 1900
- Dorcadion angorense Ganglbauer, 1897
- Dorcadion apicerufum Breuning, 1943
- Dorcadion arcivagum (Thomson, 1867)
- Dorcadion ardahense Breuning, 1975
- Dorcadion arenarioides Rabaron, 1979
- Dorcadion arenarium (Scopoli, 1763)
- Dorcadion ariannae Pesarini & Sabbadini, 2008
- Dorcadion auratum Tournier, 1872
- Dorcadion axillare Küster, 1847
- Dorcadion bangi Heyden, 1894
- Dorcadion banjkovskyi Plavilstshikov, 1958
- Dorcadion beckeri Kraatz, 1873
- Dorcadion bernhauerorum Peks, 2010
- Dorcadion berytense Breuning, 1964
- Dorcadion biforme Kraatz, 1873
- Dorcadion bisignatum Jakovlev, 1899
- Dorcadion bistriatum Pic, 1898
- Dorcadion bithyniense Chevrolat, 1856
- Dorcadion blanchardi Mulsant & Rey, 1863
- Dorcadion blandulus Holzschuh, 1977
- Dorcadion bodemeyeri K. Daniel, 1901
- Dorcadion boluense Breuning, 1962
- Dorcadion borisi Heyrovsky, 1931
- Dorcadion boszdaghense Fairmaire, 1866
- Dorcadion boucardi Pic, 1942
- Dorcadion bouilloni Breuning & Ruspoli, 1975
- Dorcadion brauni Breuning, 1979
- Dorcadion bremeri Breuning, 1981
- Dorcadion brenskei Ganglbauer, 1883
- Dorcadion brunneicolle Kraatz, 1873
- Dorcadion brunoi Breuning, 1964
- Dorcadion bulgharmaadense Breuning, 1946
- Dorcadion buresi Štěrba, 1922
- Dorcadion cachinno Thomson, 1868
- Dorcadion caprai Breuning, 1951
- Dorcadion carinipenne Pic, 1900
- Dorcadion carolisturanii Breuning, 1971
- Dorcadion caspiense Breuning, 1956
- Dorcadion chopardi Breuning, 1948
- Dorcadion chrysochroum Breuning, 1943
- Dorcadion cinctellum Fairmaire, 1866
- Dorcadion cinerarium (Fabricius, 1787)
- Dorcadion cineriferum Suvorov, 1909
- Dorcadion cingulatoides Breuning, 1946
- Dorcadion cingulatum Ganglbauer, 1884
- Dorcadion ciscaucasicum Jakovlev, 1899
- Dorcadion coiffaiti Breuning, 1962
- Dorcadion complanatum Ganglbauer, 1884
- Dorcadion condensatum Küster, 1852
- Dorcadion confluens Fairmaire, 1866
- Dorcadion corcyricum Ganglbauer, 1883
- Dorcadion crassicolle Pesarini & Sabbadini, 2007
- Dorcadion culminicola Thomson, 1868
- Dorcadion czegodaevi Danilevsky, 1992
- Dorcadion czipkai Breuning, 1973
- Dorcadion danczenkoi Danilevsky, 1996
- Dorcadion daratshitshagi Suvorov, 1915
- Dorcadion decipiens Germar, 1824
- Dorcadion demokidovi Suvorov, 1915
- Dorcadion deyrollei Ganglbauer, 1883
- Dorcadion dimidiatum Motschulsky, 1838
- Dorcadion discodivisum Pic, 1939
- Dorcadion discomaculatum Pic, 1905
- Dorcadion divisum Germar, 1839
- Dorcadion dokhtouroffi Ganglbauer, 1886
- Dorcadion drusoides Breuning, 1962
- Dorcadion drusum Chevrolat, 1870
- Dorcadion elazigi Breuning, 1971
- Dorcadion elbursense Breuning, 1943
- Dorcadion elegans Kraatz, 1873
- Dorcadion enricisturanii Breuning & Ruspoli, 1971
- Dorcadion equestre (Laxmann, 1770)
- Dorcadion etruscum (Rossi, 1790)
- Dorcadion eugeniae Ganglbauer, 1885
- Dorcadion faldermanni Ganglbauer, 1884
- Dorcadion ferruginipes Ménétries, 1836
- Dorcadion formosum Kraatz, 1870
- Dorcadion frustrator Plavilstshikov, 1958
- Dorcadion funestum Ganglbauer, 1883
- Dorcadion gallipolitanum Thomson, 1876
- Dorcadion gashtarovi Sama, Dascalu & Pesarini, 2010
- Dorcadion gebzeense Breuning, 1974
- Dorcadion glabricolle Breuning, 1943
- Dorcadion glaucum Faldermann, 1837
- Dorcadion gorbunovi Danilevsky, 1985
- Dorcadion granigerum Ganglbauer, 1883
- Dorcadion haemorrhoidale Hampe, 1852
- Dorcadion halepense Kraatz, 1873
- Dorcadion hampii Mulsant & Rey, 1863
- Dorcadion heinzi Breuning, 1964
- Dorcadion heldreichii Kraatz, 1873
- Dorcadion hellmanni Ganglbauer, 1884
- Dorcadion heyrovskyi Breuning, 1943
- Dorcadion holosericeum Krynicky, 1832
- Dorcadion holtzi Pic, 1905
- Dorcadion holzschuhi Breuning, 1974
- Dorcadion hypocritellum Breuning, 1958
- Dorcadion iconiense K. Daniel, 1901
- Dorcadion impressicolle Kraatz, 1873
- Dorcadion indutum Faldermann, 1837
- Dorcadion infernale Mulsant & Rey, 1863
- Dorcadion inikliense Bernhauer & Peks, 2010
- Dorcadion inspersum Holzschuh, 1982
- Dorcadion insulare Kraatz, 1883
- Dorcadion investitum Breuning, 1970
- Dorcadion irakense Al-Ali & Ismail, 1987
- Dorcadion iranicum Breuning, 1947
- Dorcadion ispartense Breuning, 1962
- Dorcadion jacobsoni Jakovlev, 1899
- Dorcadion jakovleviellum Plavilstshikov, 1951
- Dorcadion janatai Kadlec, 2006
- Dorcadion johannisfranci Pesarini & Sabbadini, 2007
- Dorcadion kaimakcalanum Jurecek, 1929
- Dorcadion kalashiani Danilevsky, 1996
- Dorcadion karsense Suvorov, 1916
- Dorcadion kartalense Lazarev, 2016
- Dorcadion kasikoporanum Pic, 1902
- Dorcadion kazanciense Bernhauer & Peks, 2010
- Dorcadion kharpuensis Danilevsky, 1998
- Dorcadion kindermanni Waltl, 1838
- Dorcadion kollari Kraatz, 1873
- Dorcadion komarowi Jakovlev, 1887
- Dorcadion kozanii Breuning, 1962
- Dorcadion kraetschmeri Bernhauer, 1988
- Dorcadion krueperi Ganglbauer, 1883
- Dorcadion kuldschanum Pic, 1908
- Dorcadion kurdistanum Breuning, 1944
- Dorcadion kurucanum Holzschuh, 2007
- Dorcadion kykladicum Breuning, 1944
- Dorcadion ladikanum Braun, 1976
- Dorcadion laeve Faldermann, 1837
- Dorcadion lameeri Théry, 1896
- Dorcadion lamiae Breuning, 1962
- Dorcadion ledouxi Breuning, 1974
- Dorcadion lineatocolle Kraatz, 1873
- Dorcadion lineatopunctatum Breuning, 1944
- Dorcadion litigiosum Ganglbauer, 1884
- Dorcadion ljubetense Pic, 1909
- Dorcadion lodosi Sabbadini & Pesarini, 1992
- Dorcadion longulum Breuning, 1943
- Dorcadion lohsei Braun, 1976
- Dorcadion lugubre Kraatz, 1873
- Dorcadion macedonicum Jurecek, 1929
- Dorcadion maceki Holzschuh, 1995
- Dorcadion maljushenkoi Pic, 1904
- Dorcadion maradense Holzschuh, 2007
- Dorcadion martini Bernhauer, 1988
- Dorcadion mediterraneum Breuning, 1942
- Dorcadion megriense Lazarev, 2009
- Dorcadion menradi Holzschuh, 1989
- Dorcadion merkli Ganglbauer, 1884
- Dorcadion meschniggi Breit, 1928
- Dorcadion mesopotamicum Breuning, 1944
- Dorcadion micans Thomson, 1867
- Dorcadion minkovae Heyrovsky, 1962
- Dorcadion minutum Kraatz, 1873
- Dorcadion mirabile Lazarev, 2024
- Dorcadion mniszechi Kraatz, 1873
- Dorcadion moreanum Pic, 1907
- Dorcadion morozovi Danilevsky, 1992

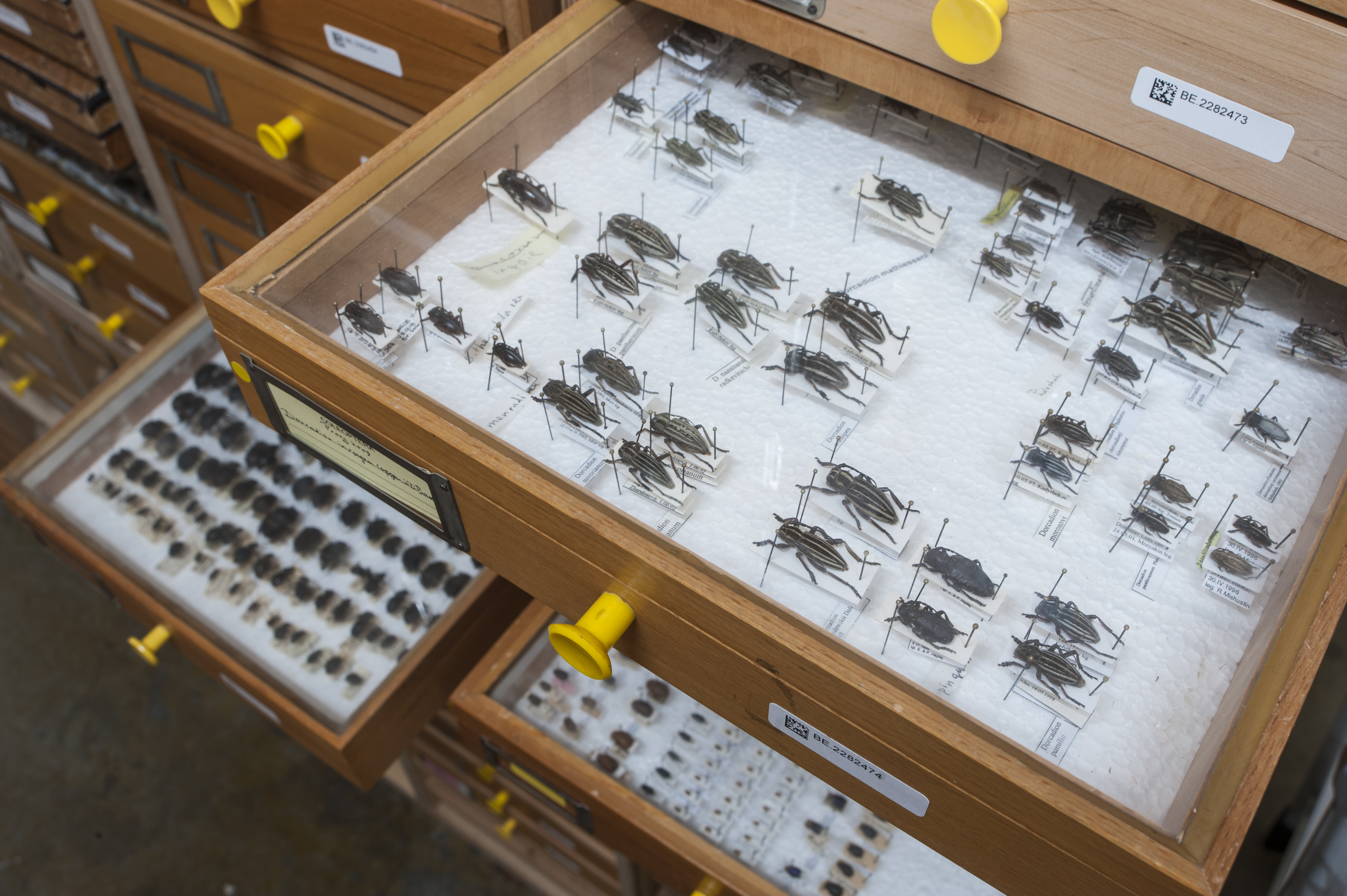
Open drawer showing rows of pinned Dorcadion. Sp

- Dorcadion multimaculatum Pic, 1932
- Dorcadion murrayi Küster, 1847
- Dorcadion narlianum Özdikmen, Mercan & Cihan, 2012
- Dorcadion nigrostriatum Adlbauer, 1982
- Dorcadion nitidum Motschulsky, 1838
- Dorcadion niveisparsum Thomson, 1865
- Dorcadion nobile Hampe, 1852
- Dorcadion nurense Danilevsky & Murzin, 2009
- Dorcadion obenbergeri Heyrovsky, 1940
- Dorcadion obtusum Breuning, 1944
- Dorcadion oetalicum Pic, 1902
- Dorcadion oezdurali Önalp, 1988
- Dorcadion olympicum Kraatz, 1873
- Dorcadion ortrudae Braun, 1978
- Dorcadion ossae Heyrovsky, 1941
- Dorcadion pararenarium Breuning, 1969
- Dorcadion pararufipenne Braun, 1976
- Dorcadion parnassi Kraatz, 1873
- Dorcadion parcepunctatum Breuning, 1948
- Dorcadion parinfernale Breuning, 1975
- Dorcadion pasquieri Breuning, 1974
- Dorcadion pavesii Pesarini & Sabbadini, 1998
- Dorcadion pedestre (Poda, 1761)
- Dorcadion peksi Bernhauer, 2010
- Dorcadion peloponesium Pic, 1902
- Dorcadion petrovitzi Heyrovský, 1964
- Dorcadion pilosellum Kraatz, 1873
- Dorcadion pilosipenne Breuning, 1943
- Dorcadion piochardi Kraatz, 1873
- Dorcadion pittinorum Pesarini & Sabbadini, 1998
- Dorcadion pluto Thomson, 1867
- Dorcadion poleti Breuning, 1948
- Dorcadion praetermissum Pesarini & Sabbadini, 1998
- Dorcadion preissi Heyden, 1894
- Dorcadion pseudarcivagum Breuning, 1943
- Dorcadion pseudinfernale Breuning, 1943
- Dorcadion pseudobithyniense Breuning, 1962
- Dorcadion pseudocinctellum Breuning, 1943
- Dorcadion pseudoholosericeum Breuning, 1962
- Dorcadion pseudonobile Breuning, 1946
- Dorcadion pseudopreissi Breuning, 1962
- Dorcadion punctipenne Küster, 1852
- Dorcadion punctulicolle Breuning, 1944
- Dorcadion purkynei Heyrovsky, 1925
- Dorcadion pusillum Küster, 1847
- Dorcadion quadripustulatum Kraatz, 1873
- Dorcadion rarepunctatum Lazarev, 2016
- Dorcadion regulare Pic, 1931
- Dorcadion reitteri Ganglbauer, 1883
- Dorcadion ressli Holzschuh, 2007
- Dorcadion rigattii Breuning, 1966
- Dorcadion rizeanum (Breuning & Villiers, 1967)
- Dorcadion robustum Ganglbauer, 1883
- Dorcadion rolandmenradi Peks, 1992
- Dorcadion rosinae Daniel, 1900
- Dorcadion rufoapicipenne Breuning, 1946
- Dorcadion rufogenum Reitter, 1895
- Dorcadion sareptanum Kraatz, 1873
- Dorcadion saulcyi Thomson, 1865
- Dorcadion scabricolle Dalman, 1817
- Dorcadion schultzei Heyden, 1894
- Dorcadion scopolii (Herbst, 1784)
- Dorcadion scrobicolle Kraatz, 1873
- Dorcadion semenovi Ganglbauer, 1883
- Dorcadion semiargentatum Pic, 1905
- Dorcadion semilineatum Fairmaire, 1866
- Dorcadion semilucens Kraatz, 1873
- Dorcadion seminudum Kraatz, 1873
- Dorcadion semivelutinum Kraatz, 1873
- Dorcadion septemlineatum Waltl, 1838
- Dorcadion sericatum Sahlberg, 1823
- Dorcadion sevliczi Danilevsky, 1985
- Dorcadion shestopalovi Danilevsky, 1993
- Dorcadion shirvanicum Bogatschew, 1934
- Dorcadion shushense Lazarev, 2010
- Dorcadion sinopense Breuning, 1962
- Dorcadion sinuatevittatum Pic, 1937
- Dorcadion sisianense Lazarev, 2009
- Dorcadion skoupyorum Bernhauer & Peks, 2013
- Dorcadion smyrnense (Linnaeus, 1757)
- Dorcadion sodale Hampe, 1852
- Dorcadion sonjae Peks, 1993
- Dorcadion spectabile Kraatz, 1873
- Dorcadion steineri Holzschuh, 1977
- Dorcadion stephaniae Pesarini & Sabbadini, 2003
- Dorcadion striolatum Kraatz, 1873
- Dorcadion sturmii Frivaldsky, 1837
- Dorcadion subcinctellum Breuning, 1962
- Dorcadion subcorpulentum Breuning, 1946
- Dorcadion subinterruptum Pic, 1900
- Dorcadion subsericatum Pic, 1901
- Dorcadion subvestitum K. Daniel, 1901
- Dorcadion sulcipenne Küster, 1847
- Dorcadion syriense Breuning, 1943
- Dorcadion taborskyi Heyrovsky, 1941
- Dorcadion talyshense Ganglbauer, 1883
- Dorcadion tauricum Waltl, 1838

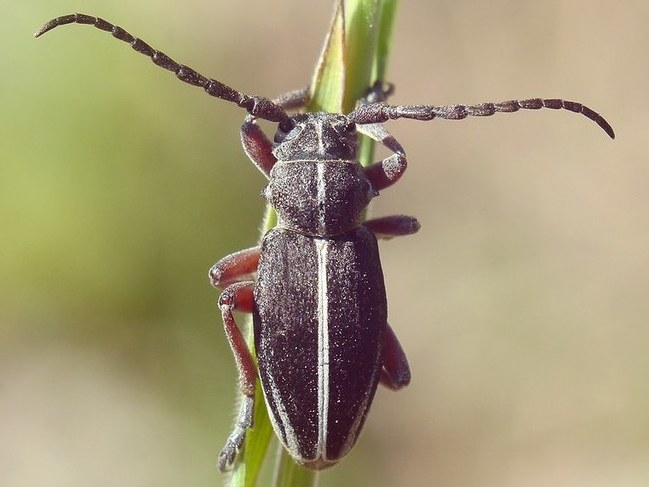
Dorcadion tauricum found in Ukraine

- Dorcadion taygetanum Pic, 1902
- Dorcadion tebrisicum Plavilstshikov, 1951
- Dorcadion theophilei Pic, 1898
- Dorcadion thessalicum Pic, 1916
- Dorcadion tuerki Ganglbauer, 1884
- Dorcadion tuleskovi Heyrovsky, 1937
- Dorcadion turcicum Breuning, 1963
- Dorcadion turkestanicum Kraatz, 1881
- Dorcadion ullrichi Bernhauer, 1988
- Dorcadion urmianum Plavilstshikov, 1937
- Dorcadion variegatum Ganglbauer, 1884
- Dorcadion veluchense Pic, 1903
- Dorcadion vincenzae Pesarini & Sabbadini, 2007
- Dorcadion wagneri Küster, 1846
- Dorcadion weyersii Fairmaire, 1866
- Dorcadion xerophilum Pesarini & Sabbadini, 2003
- Dorcadion peloponnesicum Breuning, 1982
- Dorcadion valonense Pic, 1917
- Dorcadion vittigerum (Panzer)
- Dorcadion zanteanum Breuning & Villiers, 1967

=== subgenus Dorcadion ===
- Dorcadion abakumovi Thomson, 1864
- Dorcadion alakoliense Danilevsky, 1988
- Dorcadion cephalotes Jakovlev, 1890
- Dorcadion crassipes Ballion, 1878
- Dorcadion ganglbaueri Jakovlev, 1897
- Dorcadion gebleri Kraatz, 1873
- Dorcadion glycyrrhizae (Pallas, 1773) - type species
- Dorcadion tenuelineatum Jakovlev, 1895

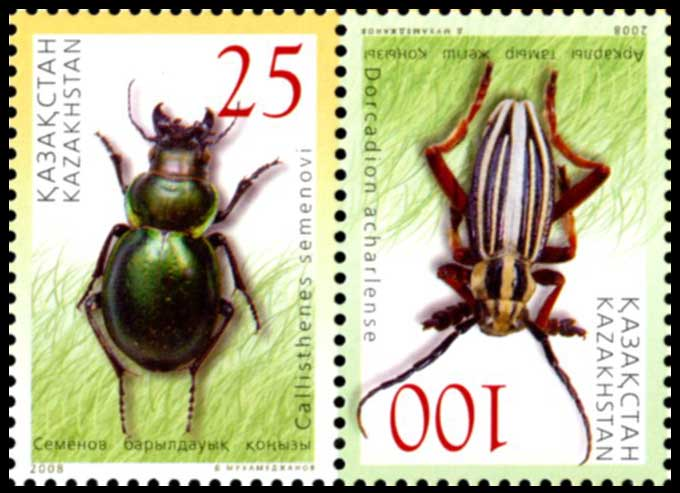
Stamp depicting Dorcadion archalense and Callisthenes semenovi

=== subgenus Maculatodorcadion ===
- Dorcadion quadrimaculatum Küster, 1848
- Dorcadion triste Frivaldszky, 1845
- Dorcadion wolfi Krätschmer, 1985

=== subgenus Megalodorcadion ===
- Dorcadion escherichi Ganglbauer, 1897
- Dorcadion glabrofasciatum K. Daniel, 1901
- Dorcadion ledereri Thomson, 1865
- Dorcadion parallelum Küster, 1847
- Dorcadion walteri Holzschuh, 1991

=== subgenus Politodorcadion ===
- Dorcadion archalense (Danilevsky, 1996)
- Dorcadion balchashense Suvorov, 1911
- Dorcadion eurygyne Suvorov, 1911
- Dorcadion lativittis Kraatz, 1878
- Dorcadion politum Dalman, 1823
- Dorcadion ribbei Kraatz, 1878
