= Dorcadion amanense =

Scientific classification
- Kingdom: Animalia
- Phylum: Arthropoda
- Clade: Pancrustacea
- Class: Insecta
- Order: Coleoptera
- Suborder: Polyphaga
- Infraorder: Cucujiformia
- Family: Cerambycidae
- Genus: Dorcadion
- Species: D. amanense

Binomial name
- Dorcadion amanense Breuning, 1943

Species of beetle

Dorcadion amanense is a species of beetle in the family Cerambycidae. It was described by Breuning in 1943.
