= Dorcadion wolfi =

Scientific classification
- Kingdom: Animalia
- Phylum: Arthropoda
- Clade: Pancrustacea
- Class: Insecta
- Order: Coleoptera
- Suborder: Polyphaga
- Infraorder: Cucujiformia
- Family: Cerambycidae
- Genus: Dorcadion
- Species: D. wolfi

Binomial name
- Dorcadion wolfi Krätschmer, 1985

Species of beetle

Dorcadion wolfi is a species of beetle in the family Cerambycidae. It was described by Krätschmer in 1985. It is known from Turkey.

== See also ==
Dorcadion
