= Dorcadion irakense =

Scientific classification
- Kingdom: Animalia
- Phylum: Arthropoda
- Clade: Pancrustacea
- Class: Insecta
- Order: Coleoptera
- Suborder: Polyphaga
- Infraorder: Cucujiformia
- Family: Cerambycidae
- Genus: Dorcadion
- Species: D. irakense

Binomial name
- Dorcadion irakense Al-Ali & Ismail, 1987

Synonyms
- Dorcadion irakensis Al-Ali & Ismail, 1987 (misspelling)

Species of beetle

Dorcadion irakense is a species of beetle in the family Cerambycidae. It was described by Al-Ali and Ismail in 1987. It is known from Iraq.
