= Dorcadion kindermanni =

Scientific classification
- Kingdom: Animalia
- Phylum: Arthropoda
- Clade: Pancrustacea
- Class: Insecta
- Order: Coleoptera
- Suborder: Polyphaga
- Infraorder: Cucujiformia
- Family: Cerambycidae
- Genus: Dorcadion
- Species: D. kindermanni

Binomial name
- Dorcadion kindermanni Waltl, 1838

Species of beetle

Dorcadion kindermanni is a species of beetle in the family Cerambycidae. It was described by Waltl in 1838. It is known from Turkey.

== Subspecies ==
- Dorcadion kindermanni var. fuscoquadriplagiatum Breuning, 1946
- Dorcadion kindermanni var. fuscoreductum Breuning, 1946
