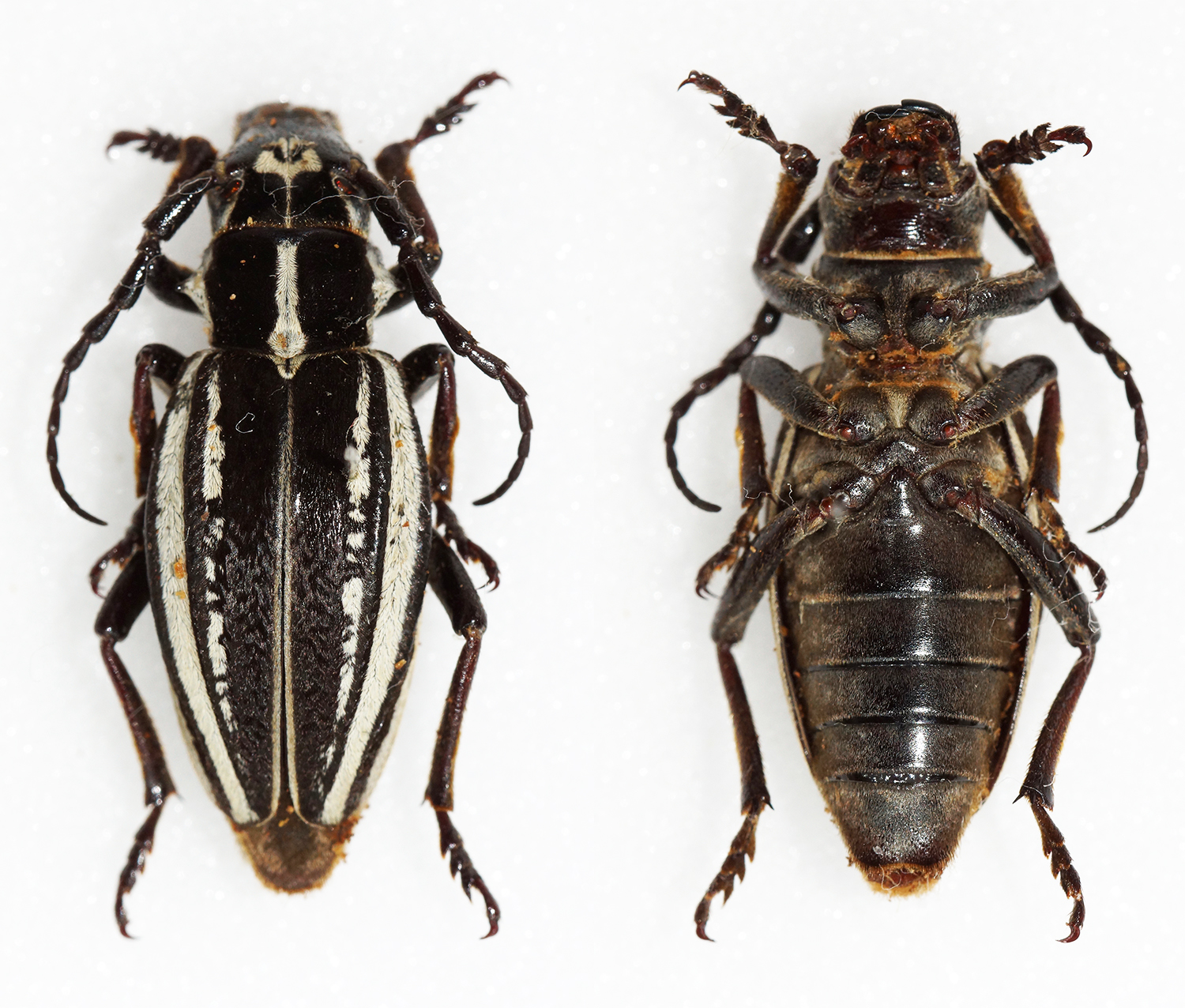

Scientific classification
- Kingdom: Animalia
- Phylum: Arthropoda
- Clade: Pancrustacea
- Class: Insecta
- Order: Coleoptera
- Suborder: Polyphaga
- Infraorder: Cucujiformia
- Family: Cerambycidae
- Genus: Dorcadion
- Species: D. gebleri

Binomial name
- Dorcadion gebleri Kraatz, 1873

Synonyms
- Dorcadion occidentale Breuning, 1947

= Dorcadion gebleri =

Species of beetle

Dorcadion gebleri is a species of beetle in the family Cerambycidae. It was described by Kraatz in 1873.

== Subspecies ==
- Dorcadion gebleri demimetrum Plavilstshikov, 1958
- Dorcadion gebleri gebleri Kraatz, 1873
- Dorcadion gebleri lukhtanovi Danilevsky, 1996
- Dorcadion gebleri takyr Danilevsky, 1996

== See also ==
Dorcadion
