= Dorcadion ladikanum =

Scientific classification
- Kingdom: Animalia
- Phylum: Arthropoda
- Clade: Pancrustacea
- Class: Insecta
- Order: Coleoptera
- Suborder: Polyphaga
- Infraorder: Cucujiformia
- Family: Cerambycidae
- Genus: Dorcadion
- Species: D. ladikanum

Binomial name
- Dorcadion ladikanum Braun, 1976

Synonyms
- Dorcadion ladikense Breuning, 1975; Dorcadion paraladikense Breuning, 1977

Species of beetle

Dorcadion ladikanum is a species of beetle in the family Cerambycidae. It was described by Walter Braun in 1976. It is known from Turkey.
