= Dorcadion maderi =

Scientific classification
- Kingdom: Animalia
- Phylum: Arthropoda
- Clade: Pancrustacea
- Class: Insecta
- Order: Coleoptera
- Suborder: Polyphaga
- Infraorder: Cucujiformia
- Family: Cerambycidae
- Genus: Dorcadion
- Species: D. maderi

Binomial name
- Dorcadion maderi Breit, 1923

Synonyms
- Carinatodorcadion maderi (Breit, 1923)

Species of beetle

Dorcadion maderi is a species of beetle in the family Cerambycidae. It was described by Breit in 1923. It is known from Albania.

== See also ==
Dorcadion
