= Dorcadion inspersum =

Scientific classification
- Kingdom: Animalia
- Phylum: Arthropoda
- Clade: Pancrustacea
- Class: Insecta
- Order: Coleoptera
- Suborder: Polyphaga
- Infraorder: Cucujiformia
- Family: Cerambycidae
- Genus: Dorcadion
- Species: D. inspersum

Binomial name
- Dorcadion inspersum Holzschuh, 1982

Species of beetle

Dorcadion inspersum is a species of beetle in the family Cerambycidae. It was described by Holzschuh in 1982. It is known from Turkey.
