= Dorcadion macedonicum =

Scientific classification
- Kingdom: Animalia
- Phylum: Arthropoda
- Clade: Pancrustacea
- Class: Insecta
- Order: Coleoptera
- Suborder: Polyphaga
- Infraorder: Cucujiformia
- Family: Cerambycidae
- Genus: Dorcadion
- Species: D. macedonicum

Binomial name
- Dorcadion macedonicum Jurecek, 1929

Synonyms
- Dorcadion glabriscapus Breuning, 1943; Pedestredorcadion glabriscapus (Breuning, 1943); Pedestredorcadion macedonicum (Jurecek, 1929); Dorcadion (Cribrodorcadion) macedonicum (Jurecek, 1929) (misspelling)

Species of beetle

Dorcadion macedonicum is a species of beetle in the family Cerambycidae. It was described by Jurecek in 1929. It is known from Albania and North Macedonia.
