= Dorcadion sericatum =

Scientific classification
- Kingdom: Animalia
- Phylum: Arthropoda
- Clade: Pancrustacea
- Class: Insecta
- Order: Coleoptera
- Suborder: Polyphaga
- Infraorder: Cucujiformia
- Family: Cerambycidae
- Genus: Dorcadion
- Species: D. sericatum

Binomial name
- Dorcadion sericatum Sahlberg, 1823

Synonyms
- Pedestredorcadion sericatum (Sahlberg) Sama, 2002

Species of beetle

Dorcadion sericatum is a species of beetle in the family Cerambycidae. It was described by Sahlberg in 1823. It is known from Ukraine.
