= Dorcadion bisignatum =

Scientific classification
- Kingdom: Animalia
- Phylum: Arthropoda
- Clade: Pancrustacea
- Class: Insecta
- Order: Coleoptera
- Suborder: Polyphaga
- Infraorder: Cucujiformia
- Family: Cerambycidae
- Genus: Dorcadion
- Species: D. bisignatum

Binomial name
- Dorcadion bisignatum Jakovlev, 1899

Species of beetle

Dorcadion bisignatum is a species of beetle in the family Cerambycidae. It was described by Jakovlev in 1899. It is known from Turkey.
