= Dorcadion oetalicum =

Scientific classification
- Kingdom: Animalia
- Phylum: Arthropoda
- Clade: Pancrustacea
- Class: Insecta
- Order: Coleoptera
- Suborder: Polyphaga
- Infraorder: Cucujiformia
- Family: Cerambycidae
- Genus: Dorcadion
- Species: D. oetalicum

Binomial name
- Dorcadion oetalicum Pic, 1902

Synonyms
- Dorcadion heldreichi var. oetalicum Pic, 1902

Species of beetle

Dorcadion oetalicum is a species of beetle in the family Cerambycidae. It was described by Maurice Pic in 1902, originally as a varietas of the species Dorcadion heldreichi. It is known from Greece.
