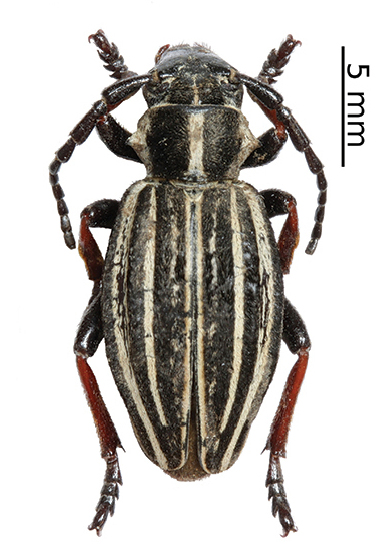

Scientific classification
- Kingdom: Animalia
- Phylum: Arthropoda
- Clade: Pancrustacea
- Class: Insecta
- Order: Coleoptera
- Suborder: Polyphaga
- Infraorder: Cucujiformia
- Family: Cerambycidae
- Genus: Dorcadion
- Species: D. tenuelineatum

Binomial name
- Dorcadion tenuelineatum Jakovlev, 1895

= Dorcadion tenuelineatum =

Species of beetle

Dorcadion tenuelineatum is a species of beetle in the family Cerambycidae. It was described by Jakovlev in 1895.

== See also ==
Dorcadion
