= Dorcadion dimidiatum =

Scientific classification
- Kingdom: Animalia
- Phylum: Arthropoda
- Clade: Pancrustacea
- Class: Insecta
- Order: Coleoptera
- Suborder: Polyphaga
- Infraorder: Cucujiformia
- Family: Cerambycidae
- Genus: Dorcadion
- Species: D. dimidiatum

Binomial name
- Dorcadion dimidiatum Motschulsky, 1838

Synonyms
- Dorcadion erivanicum Pic, 1901

Species of beetle

Dorcadion dimidiatum is a species of beetle in the family Cerambycidae. It was described by Victor Motschulsky in 1838. It is found in Iran, Turkey and Armenia.

== Subspecies ==
- Dorcadion dimidiatum dimidiatum Motschulsky, 1838
- Dorcadion dimidiatum kelkiticum Özdikmen & Hasbenli, 2004
- Dorcadion dimidiatum korgei Breuning, 1966
