= Dorcadion lugubre =

Scientific classification
- Kingdom: Animalia
- Phylum: Arthropoda
- Clade: Pancrustacea
- Class: Insecta
- Order: Coleoptera
- Suborder: Polyphaga
- Infraorder: Cucujiformia
- Family: Cerambycidae
- Genus: Dorcadion
- Species: D. lugubre

Binomial name
- Dorcadion lugubre Kraatz, 1873

Synonyms
- Dorcadion salonicum Pic, 1916; Pedestredorcadion lugubre (Kraatz) Sama, 2002

Species of beetle

Dorcadion lugubre is a species of beetle in the family Cerambycidae. It was described by Kraatz in 1873. It is known from Greece, Bulgaria, Albania, and North Macedonia.
