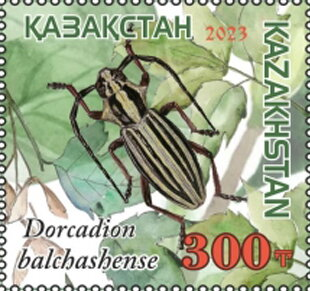

Scientific classification
- Kingdom: Animalia
- Phylum: Arthropoda
- Clade: Pancrustacea
- Class: Insecta
- Order: Coleoptera
- Suborder: Polyphaga
- Infraorder: Cucujiformia
- Family: Cerambycidae
- Genus: Dorcadion
- Species: D. balchashense

Binomial name
- Dorcadion balchashense Suvorov, 1911

= Dorcadion balchashense =

Species of beetle

Dorcadion balchashense is a species of beetle in the family Cerambycidae. It was described by Suvorov in 1911.

== Subspecies ==
- Dorcadion balchashense balchashense Suvorov, 1911
- Dorcadion balchashense betpakdalense Danilevsky, 1996

== See also ==
Dorcadion
