= Dorcadion oezdurali =

Scientific classification
- Kingdom: Animalia
- Phylum: Arthropoda
- Clade: Pancrustacea
- Class: Insecta
- Order: Coleoptera
- Suborder: Polyphaga
- Infraorder: Cucujiformia
- Family: Cerambycidae
- Genus: Dorcadion
- Species: D. oezdurali

Binomial name
- Dorcadion oezdurali Önalp, 1988

Species of beetle

Dorcadion oezdurali is a species of beetle in the family Cerambycidae. It was described by Önalp in 1988. It is known from Turkey.
