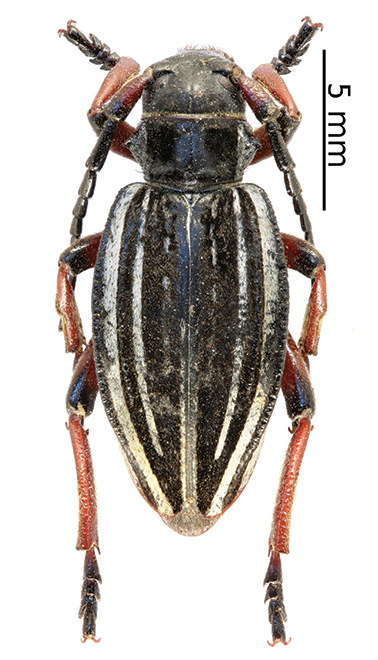
- Dorcadion suvorovi konyrolenum (female)

Scientific classification
- Kingdom: Animalia
- Phylum: Arthropoda
- Clade: Pancrustacea
- Class: Insecta
- Order: Coleoptera
- Suborder: Polyphaga
- Infraorder: Cucujiformia
- Family: Cerambycidae
- Genus: Dorcadion
- Species: D. suvorovi

Binomial name
- Dorcadion suvorovi Jakovlev, 1906

= Dorcadion suvorovi =

Species of beetle

Dorcadion suvorovi is a species of beetle in the family Cerambycidae. It was described by Jakovlev in 1906.

== Subspecies ==
- Dorcadion suvorovi karachokensis Danilevsky, 1996
- Dorcadion suvorovi konyrolenus Danilevsky, 1996
- Dorcadion suvorovi suvorovi Jakovlev, 1906
- Dorcadion suvorovi taldykurganus Danilevsky, 1996
- Dorcadion suvorovi tekeliensis Danilevsky, 1996

== See also ==
- Dorcadion
