= Dorcadion confluens =

Scientific classification
- Kingdom: Animalia
- Phylum: Arthropoda
- Clade: Pancrustacea
- Class: Insecta
- Order: Coleoptera
- Suborder: Polyphaga
- Infraorder: Cucujiformia
- Family: Cerambycidae
- Genus: Dorcadion
- Species: D. confluens

Binomial name
- Dorcadion confluens Fairmaire, 1866

Synonyms
- Dorcadion divisum m. confluens Breuning, 1962; Dorcadion subobscuripes Pic, 1914

Species of beetle

Dorcadion confluens is a species of beetle in the family Cerambycidae. It was described by Fairmaire in 1866. It is known from Turkey.

== See also ==
Dorcadion
