= Dorcadion irinae =

Scientific classification
- Kingdom: Animalia
- Phylum: Arthropoda
- Clade: Pancrustacea
- Class: Insecta
- Order: Coleoptera
- Suborder: Polyphaga
- Infraorder: Cucujiformia
- Family: Cerambycidae
- Genus: Dorcadion
- Species: D. irinae

Binomial name
- Dorcadion irinae Danilevsky, 1997

Species of beetle

Dorcadion irinae is a species of beetle in the family Cerambycidae. It was described by Mikhail Leontievich Danilevsky in 1997. It is known from Kazakhstan.
