= Dorcadion parnassi =

Scientific classification
- Kingdom: Animalia
- Phylum: Arthropoda
- Clade: Pancrustacea
- Class: Insecta
- Order: Coleoptera
- Suborder: Polyphaga
- Infraorder: Cucujiformia
- Family: Cerambycidae
- Genus: Dorcadion
- Species: D. parnassi

Binomial name
- Dorcadion parnassi Kraatz, 1873

Synonyms
- Dorcadion oertzeni Ganglbauer, 1883; Dorcadion saulcyi var. parnassi Kraatz, 1873; Pedestredorcadion parnassi (Kraatz) Sama, 2002

Species of beetle

Dorcadion parnassi is a species of beetle in the family Cerambycidae. It was described by Kraatz in 1873. It is known from Greece. It contains the varietas Dorcadion parnassi var. albipenne.
