= Dorcadion glycyrrhizae =

Scientific classification
- Kingdom: Animalia
- Phylum: Arthropoda
- Clade: Pancrustacea
- Class: Insecta
- Order: Coleoptera
- Suborder: Polyphaga
- Infraorder: Cucujiformia
- Family: Cerambycidae
- Genus: Dorcadion
- Species: D. glycyrrhizae

Binomial name
- Dorcadion glycyrrhizae (Pallas, 1773)

Synonyms
- Dorcadion glicyrrhizae (Pallas, 1773)

Species of beetle

Dorcadion glycyrrhizae is a species of beetle in the family Cerambycidae. It was described by Pallas in 1773.

== Subspecies ==
- Dorcadion glycyrrhizae androsovi Suvorov, 1909
- Dorcadion glycyrrhizae dostojewskii Semenov, 1899
- Dorcadion glycyrrhizae dubianskii Jakovlev, 1906
- Dorcadion glycyrrhizae fedorenkoi Danilevsky, 2001
- Dorcadion glycyrrhizae galinae Danilevsky, 2001
- Dorcadion glycyrrhizae glycyrrhizae (Pallas, 1773)
- Dorcadion glycyrrhizae guberlensis Danilevsky, 2006
- Dorcadion glycyrrhizae iliense Plavilstshikov, 1937
- Dorcadion glycyrrhizae inderiense Suvorov, 1911
- Dorcadion glycyrrhizae korshikovi Danilevsky, 2006
- Dorcadion glycyrrhizae nemkovi Danilevsky, 2006
- Dorcadion glycyrrhizae nikireevi Danilevsky, 2001
- Dorcadion glycyrrhizae obtusipenne Motschulsky, 1860
- Dorcadion glycyrrhizae striatum (Goeze, 1777)
- Dorcadion glycyrrhizae tobolense Danilevsky, 2001
- Dorcadion glycyrrhizae turgaicum Suvorov, 1915
- Dorcadion glycyrrhizae uvarovi Suvorov, 1911

== See also ==
Dorcadion
