= Dorcadion glabrofasciatum =

Scientific classification
- Kingdom: Animalia
- Phylum: Arthropoda
- Clade: Pancrustacea
- Class: Insecta
- Order: Coleoptera
- Suborder: Polyphaga
- Infraorder: Cucujiformia
- Family: Cerambycidae
- Genus: Dorcadion
- Species: D. glabrofasciatum

Binomial name
- Dorcadion glabrofasciatum K. Daniel, 1900

Synonyms
- Dorcadion glabrofasciatum var. imparivittatum K. Daniel, 1900; Dorcadion glabrofasciatum m. parivittatum Breuning, 1946; Dorcadion glabrofasciatum m. glabroseparatum Breuning, 1962

Species of beetle

Dorcadion glabrofasciatum is a species of beetle in the family Cerambycidae. It was described by Karl Daniel in 1900. It is known from Turkey.

== See also ==
Dorcadion
