= Dorcadion blanchardi =

Scientific classification
- Kingdom: Animalia
- Phylum: Arthropoda
- Clade: Pancrustacea
- Class: Insecta
- Order: Coleoptera
- Suborder: Polyphaga
- Infraorder: Cucujiformia
- Family: Cerambycidae
- Genus: Dorcadion
- Species: D. blanchardi

Binomial name
- Dorcadion blanchardi Mulsant & Rey, 1863

Species of beetle

Dorcadion blanchardi is a species of beetle in the family Cerambycidae. It was described by Mulsant and Rey in 1863. It is known from Iran and Turkey.
