= Dorcadion suvorovianum =

Scientific classification
- Kingdom: Animalia
- Phylum: Arthropoda
- Clade: Pancrustacea
- Class: Insecta
- Order: Coleoptera
- Suborder: Polyphaga
- Infraorder: Cucujiformia
- Family: Cerambycidae
- Genus: Dorcadion
- Species: D. suvorovianum

Binomial name
- Dorcadion suvorovianum Plavilstshikov, 1916

Species of beetle

Dorcadion suvorovianum is a species of beetle in the family Cerambycidae. It was described by Plavilstshikov in 1916.

== See also ==
- Dorcadion
