= Dorcadion shirvanicum =

Scientific classification
- Kingdom: Animalia
- Phylum: Arthropoda
- Clade: Pancrustacea
- Class: Insecta
- Order: Coleoptera
- Suborder: Polyphaga
- Infraorder: Cucujiformia
- Family: Cerambycidae
- Genus: Dorcadion
- Species: D. shirvanicum

Binomial name
- Dorcadion shirvanicum Bogatschew, 1934

Species of beetle

Dorcadion shirvanicum is a species of beetle in the family Cerambycidae. It was described by Bogatschew in 1934. It is known from Azerbaijan.

== Species ==
- Dorcadion shirvanicum azerbajdzhanicum Plavilstshikov, 1937
- Dorcadion shirvanicum shirvanicum Bogatschew, 1934
