= Dorcadion semilineatum =

Scientific classification
- Kingdom: Animalia
- Phylum: Arthropoda
- Clade: Pancrustacea
- Class: Insecta
- Order: Coleoptera
- Suborder: Polyphaga
- Infraorder: Cucujiformia
- Family: Cerambycidae
- Genus: Dorcadion
- Species: D. semilineatum

Binomial name
- Dorcadion semilineatum Fairmaire, 1866

Species of beetle

Dorcadion semilineatum is a species of beetle in the family Cerambycidae. It was described by Fairmaire in 1866. It is known from Turkey.
