= Dorcadion murrayi =

Scientific classification
- Kingdom: Animalia
- Phylum: Arthropoda
- Clade: Pancrustacea
- Class: Insecta
- Order: Coleoptera
- Suborder: Polyphaga
- Infraorder: Cucujiformia
- Family: Cerambycidae
- Genus: Dorcadion
- Species: D. murrayi

Binomial name
- Dorcadion murrayi Küster, 1847

Synonyms
- Pedestredorcadion murrayi (Küster, 1847)

Species of beetle

Dorcadion murrayi is a species of beetle in the family Cerambycidae. It was described by Küster in 1847. It is known from Romania, Hungary, Croatia, and Serbia.
