= Dorcadion veluchense =

Scientific classification
- Kingdom: Animalia
- Phylum: Arthropoda
- Clade: Pancrustacea
- Class: Insecta
- Order: Coleoptera
- Suborder: Polyphaga
- Infraorder: Cucujiformia
- Family: Cerambycidae
- Genus: Dorcadion
- Species: D. veluchense

Binomial name
- Dorcadion veluchense Pic, 1903

Synonyms
- Pedestredorcadion veluchense (Pic, 1903)

Species of beetle

Dorcadion veluchense is a species of beetle in the family Cerambycidae. It was described by Maurice Pic in 1903. It is known from Greece.
