= Dorcadion kharpuensis =

Scientific classification
- Kingdom: Animalia
- Phylum: Arthropoda
- Clade: Pancrustacea
- Class: Insecta
- Order: Coleoptera
- Suborder: Polyphaga
- Infraorder: Cucujiformia
- Family: Cerambycidae
- Genus: Dorcadion
- Species: D. kharpuensis

Binomial name
- Dorcadion kharpuensis Danilevsky, 1998

Species of beetle

Dorcadion kharpuensis is a species of beetle in the family Cerambycidae. It was described by Mikhail Leontievich Danilevsky in 1998. It is known from Iran.
