= Dorcadion punctipenne =

Scientific classification
- Kingdom: Animalia
- Phylum: Arthropoda
- Clade: Pancrustacea
- Class: Insecta
- Order: Coleoptera
- Suborder: Polyphaga
- Infraorder: Cucujiformia
- Family: Cerambycidae
- Genus: Dorcadion
- Species: D. punctipenne

Binomial name
- Dorcadion punctipenne Küster, 1852

Synonyms
- Dorcadion condensatum var. punctipenne (Küster) Ganglabuer, 1884; Dorcadion olympicum var. distinguendum Pic, 1931

Species of beetle

Dorcadion punctipenne is a species of beetle in the family Cerambycidae. It was described by Küster in 1852. It is known from Turkey.
