= Dorcadion minutum =

Scientific classification
- Kingdom: Animalia
- Phylum: Arthropoda
- Clade: Pancrustacea
- Class: Insecta
- Order: Coleoptera
- Suborder: Polyphaga
- Infraorder: Cucujiformia
- Family: Cerambycidae
- Genus: Dorcadion
- Species: D. minutum

Binomial name
- Dorcadion minutum Kraatz, 1873

Synonyms
- Pedestredorcadion minutum (Kraatz, 1873)

Species of beetle

Dorcadion minutum is a species of beetle in the family Cerambycidae. It was described by Gustav Kraatz in 1873. It was first found in Greece.

== Subspecies ==
- Dorcadion minutum atticum Kraatz, 1873
- Dorcadion minutum mimarenarium Breuning, 1974
- Dorcadion minutum minutum Kraatz, 1873
