= Dorcadion taygetanum =

Scientific classification
- Kingdom: Animalia
- Phylum: Arthropoda
- Clade: Pancrustacea
- Class: Insecta
- Order: Coleoptera
- Suborder: Polyphaga
- Infraorder: Cucujiformia
- Family: Cerambycidae
- Genus: Dorcadion
- Species: D. taygetanum

Binomial name
- Dorcadion taygetanum Pic, 1902

Synonyms
- Pedestredorcadion taygetanum (Pic) Sama, 2002

Species of beetle

Dorcadion taygetanum is a species of beetle in the family Cerambycidae. It was described by Maurice Pic in 1902. It is known from Greece.
