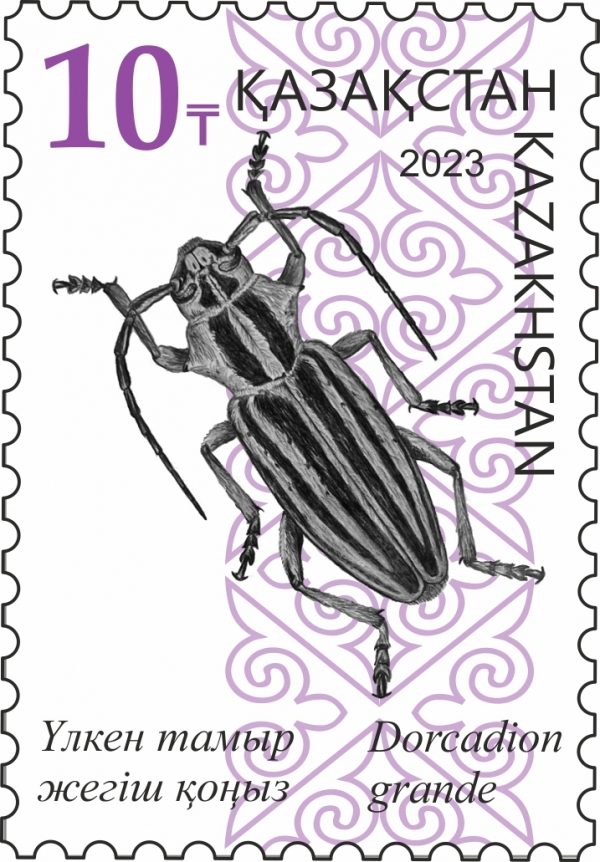

Scientific classification
- Kingdom: Animalia
- Phylum: Arthropoda
- Clade: Pancrustacea
- Class: Insecta
- Order: Coleoptera
- Suborder: Polyphaga
- Infraorder: Cucujiformia
- Family: Cerambycidae
- Genus: Dorcadion
- Species: D. grande

Binomial name
- Dorcadion grande Jakovlev, 1906

= Dorcadion grande =

Species of beetle

Dorcadion grande is a species of beetle belonging to the family Cerambycidae. Described by B.E. Jakovlev in 1906, it is found in Kazakhstan.

== See also ==
- Dorcadion
