= Dorcadion rufoapicipenne =

Scientific classification
- Kingdom: Animalia
- Phylum: Arthropoda
- Clade: Pancrustacea
- Class: Insecta
- Order: Coleoptera
- Suborder: Polyphaga
- Infraorder: Cucujiformia
- Family: Cerambycidae
- Genus: Dorcadion
- Species: D. rufoapicipenne

Binomial name
- Dorcadion rufoapicipenne Breuning, 1946

Species of beetle

Dorcadion rufoapicipenne is a species of beetle in the family Cerambycidae. It was described by Stephan von Breuning in 1946.
