= Dorcadion anatolicum =

Scientific classification
- Kingdom: Animalia
- Phylum: Arthropoda
- Clade: Pancrustacea
- Class: Insecta
- Order: Coleoptera
- Suborder: Polyphaga
- Infraorder: Cucujiformia
- Family: Cerambycidae
- Genus: Dorcadion
- Species: D. anatolicum

Binomial name
- Dorcadion anatolicum Pic, 1900

Species of beetle

Dorcadion anatolicum is a species of beetle in the family Cerambycidae. It was described by Maurice Pic in 1900. It is known from Turkey. It contains the varietas Dorcadion anatolicum var. subuniforme.
