= Dorcadion arenarioides =

Scientific classification
- Kingdom: Animalia
- Phylum: Arthropoda
- Clade: Pancrustacea
- Class: Insecta
- Order: Coleoptera
- Suborder: Polyphaga
- Infraorder: Cucujiformia
- Family: Cerambycidae
- Genus: Dorcadion
- Species: D. arenarioides

Binomial name
- Dorcadion arenarioides Rabaron, 1979

Synonyms
- Pedestredorcadion arenarioides (Rabaron) Sama, 2002

Species of beetle

Dorcadion arenarioides is a species of beetle in the family Cerambycidae. It was described by Rabaron in 1979. It is known from Greece.
