= Dorcadion saulcyi =

Scientific classification
- Kingdom: Animalia
- Phylum: Arthropoda
- Clade: Pancrustacea
- Class: Insecta
- Order: Coleoptera
- Suborder: Polyphaga
- Infraorder: Cucujiformia
- Family: Cerambycidae
- Genus: Dorcadion
- Species: D. saulcyi

Binomial name
- Dorcadion saulcyi Thomson, 1865

Species of beetle

Dorcadion saulcyi is a species of beetle in the family Cerambycidae. It was described by Thomson in 1865. It is known from Turkey. It contains the varietas Dorcadion saulcyi var. fenestratum.

== Subspecies ==
- Dorcadion saulcyi javeti Kraatz, 1873
- Dorcadion saulcyi saulcyi Thomson, 1865
