= Dorcadion subinterruptum =

Scientific classification
- Kingdom: Animalia
- Phylum: Arthropoda
- Clade: Pancrustacea
- Class: Insecta
- Order: Coleoptera
- Suborder: Polyphaga
- Infraorder: Cucujiformia
- Family: Cerambycidae
- Genus: Dorcadion
- Species: D. subinterruptum

Binomial name
- Dorcadion subinterruptum Pic, 1900

Synonyms
- Dorcadion divisum var. subinterruptum Pic, 1900

Species of beetle

Dorcadion subinterruptum is a species of beetle in the family Cerambycidae. It was described by Maurice Pic in 1900. It is known from Turkey.

== Varietas ==
- Dorcadion subinterruptum var. exiguum Breuning, 1946
- Dorcadion subinterruptum var. indivisum Pic, 1900
- Dorcadion subinterruptum var. interruptevittatum Breuning, 1946
- Dorcadion subinterruptum var. posticeconjunctum Breuning, 1946
