= Dorcadion inikliense =

Scientific classification
- Kingdom: Animalia
- Phylum: Arthropoda
- Clade: Pancrustacea
- Class: Insecta
- Order: Coleoptera
- Suborder: Polyphaga
- Infraorder: Cucujiformia
- Family: Cerambycidae
- Genus: Dorcadion
- Species: D. inikliense

Binomial name
- Dorcadion inikliense Bernhauer & Peks, 2010

Species of beetle

Dorcadion inikliense is a species of beetle in the family Cerambycidae. It was described by Bernhauer and Peks in 2010.
