= Dorcadion cachinno =

Scientific classification
- Kingdom: Animalia
- Phylum: Arthropoda
- Clade: Pancrustacea
- Class: Insecta
- Order: Coleoptera
- Suborder: Polyphaga
- Infraorder: Cucujiformia
- Family: Cerambycidae
- Genus: Dorcadion
- Species: D. cachinno

Binomial name
- Dorcadion cachinno Thomson, 1868

Species of beetle

Dorcadion cachinno is a species of beetle in the family Cerambycidae. It was described by Thomson in 1868.
