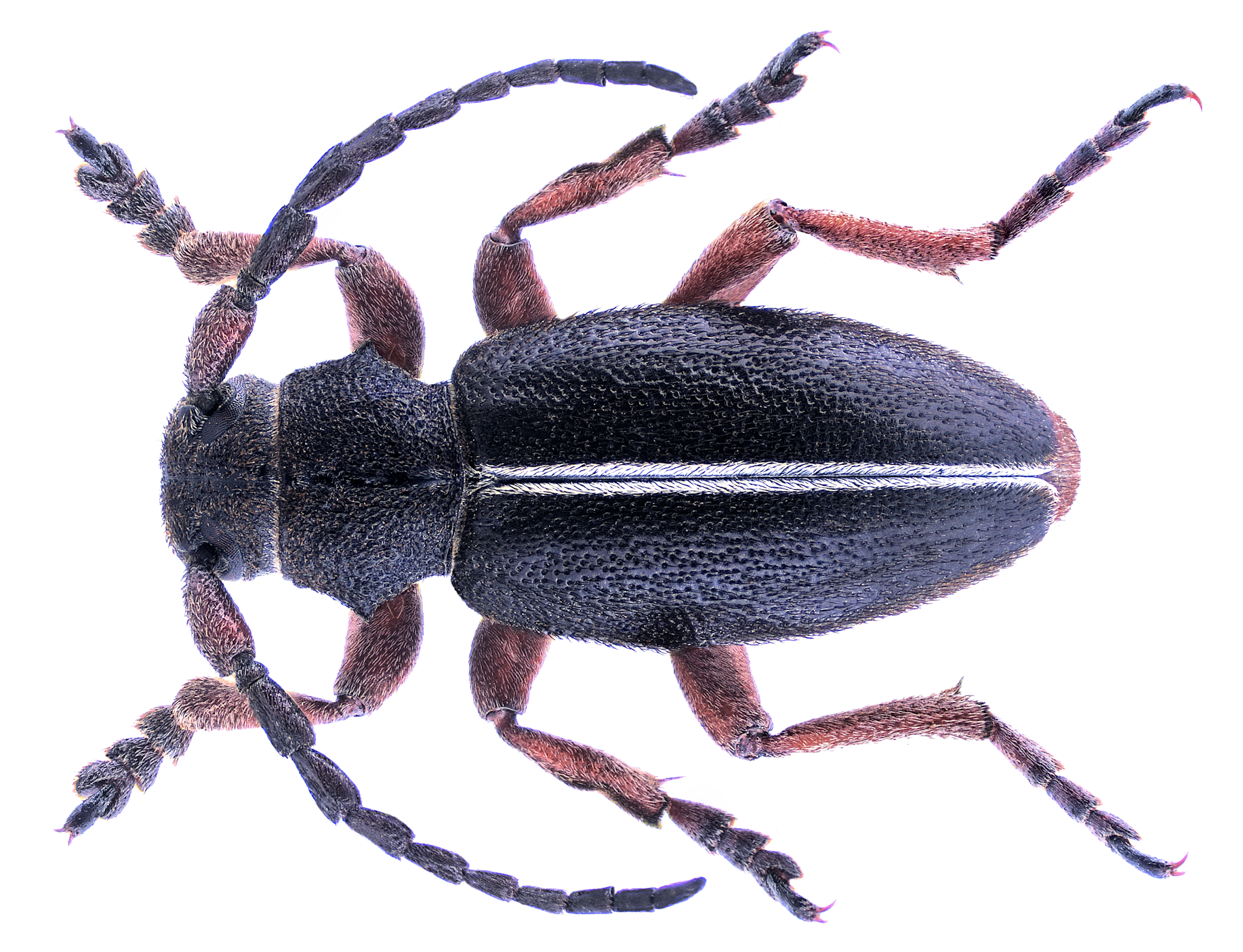

Scientific classification
- Kingdom: Animalia
- Phylum: Arthropoda
- Clade: Pancrustacea
- Class: Insecta
- Order: Coleoptera
- Suborder: Polyphaga
- Infraorder: Cucujiformia
- Family: Cerambycidae
- Genus: Dorcadion
- Species: D. lineatocolle

Binomial name
- Dorcadion lineatocolle Kraatz, 1873

Synonyms
- Dorcadion femoratum var. lineatocolle Kraatz, 1873; Dorcadion pseudolineatocolle Breuning, 1962; Dorcadion sinuaticolle Pic, 1927; Pedestredorcadion lineatocolle (Kraatz) Sama, 2002; Pedestredorcadion pseudolineatocolle (Breuning) Sama, 2002

= Dorcadion lineatocolle =

Species of beetle

Dorcadion lineatocolle is a species of beetle in the family Cerambycidae. It was described by Kraatz in 1873. It is known from North Macedonia, Greece, Bulgaria, and Serbia.
