= Dorcadion lodosi =

Scientific classification
- Kingdom: Animalia
- Phylum: Arthropoda
- Clade: Pancrustacea
- Class: Insecta
- Order: Coleoptera
- Suborder: Polyphaga
- Infraorder: Cucujiformia
- Family: Cerambycidae
- Genus: Dorcadion
- Species: D. lodosi

Binomial name
- Dorcadion lodosi Sabbadini & Pesarini, 1992

Species of beetle

Dorcadion lodosi is a species of beetle in the family Cerambycidae. It was described by Sabbadini and Pesarini in 1992.

== Subspecies ==
- Dorcadion lodosi abanozense Bernhauer & Peks, 2010
- Dorcadion lodosi lodosi Sabbadini & Pesarini, 1992
