= Dorcadion accola =

Scientific classification
- Kingdom: Animalia
- Phylum: Arthropoda
- Clade: Pancrustacea
- Class: Insecta
- Order: Coleoptera
- Suborder: Polyphaga
- Infraorder: Cucujiformia
- Family: Cerambycidae
- Genus: Dorcadion
- Species: D. accola

Binomial name
- Dorcadion accola Heyden, 1894

Synonyms
- Dorcadion delagrangei Pic, 1894; Dorcadion glabrolineatum Pic, 1927

Species of beetle

Dorcadion accola is a species of beetle in the family Cerambycidae. It was described by Heyden in 1894. It is known from Turkey.
