= Dorcadion mystacinum =

Scientific classification
- Kingdom: Animalia
- Phylum: Arthropoda
- Clade: Pancrustacea
- Class: Insecta
- Order: Coleoptera
- Suborder: Polyphaga
- Infraorder: Cucujiformia
- Family: Cerambycidae
- Genus: Dorcadion
- Species: D. mystacinum

Binomial name
- Dorcadion mystacinum Ballion, 1878

Species of beetle

Dorcadion mystacinum is a species of beetles in the family Cerambycidae. It was described by Ballion in 1878. It is known from Kazakhstan.

== Subspecies ==
- Dorcadion mystacinum mystacinum Ballion, 1878
- Dorcadion mystacinum pumilio Plavilstshikov, 1951
- Dorcadion mystacinum rufidens Jakovlev, 1906

== See also ==
- Dorcadion
