= Dorcadion buresi =

Scientific classification
- Kingdom: Animalia
- Phylum: Arthropoda
- Clade: Pancrustacea
- Class: Insecta
- Order: Coleoptera
- Suborder: Polyphaga
- Infraorder: Cucujiformia
- Family: Cerambycidae
- Genus: Dorcadion
- Species: D. buresi

Binomial name
- Dorcadion buresi Štěrba, 1922

Synonyms
- Pedestredorcadion buresi (Štěrba, 1922)

Species of beetle

Dorcadion buresi is a species of beetle in the family Cerambycidae. It was described by Štěrba in 1922. It is known from Greece.
