= Dorcadion skoupyorum =

Scientific classification
- Kingdom: Animalia
- Phylum: Arthropoda
- Clade: Pancrustacea
- Class: Insecta
- Order: Coleoptera
- Suborder: Polyphaga
- Infraorder: Cucujiformia
- Family: Cerambycidae
- Genus: Dorcadion
- Species: D. skoupyorum

Binomial name
- Dorcadion skoupyorum Bernhauer & Peks, 2013

Synonyms
- Dorcadion skoupyi Bernhauer & Peks, 2013 nec Lazarev, 2013

Species of beetle

Dorcadion skoupyorum is a species of beetle in the family Cerambycidae. It was described by Bernhauer and Peks in 2013. It is known from Turkey.
