= Dorcadion weyersii =

Scientific classification
- Kingdom: Animalia
- Phylum: Arthropoda
- Clade: Pancrustacea
- Class: Insecta
- Order: Coleoptera
- Suborder: Polyphaga
- Infraorder: Cucujiformia
- Family: Cerambycidae
- Genus: Dorcadion
- Species: D. weyersii

Binomial name
- Dorcadion weyersii Fairmaire, 1866

Synonyms
- Dorcadion weyersi m. aolense Pic, 1942; Dorcadion weyersi m. brunneicolor Breuning, 1946; Dorcadion weyersi m. subbrunneicolor Breuning, 1946

Species of beetle

Dorcadion weyersii is a species of beetle in the family Cerambycidae. It was described by Fairmaire in 1866. It is known from Turkey.
