= Dorcadion bernhauerorum =

Scientific classification
- Kingdom: Animalia
- Phylum: Arthropoda
- Clade: Pancrustacea
- Class: Insecta
- Order: Coleoptera
- Suborder: Polyphaga
- Infraorder: Cucujiformia
- Family: Cerambycidae
- Genus: Dorcadion
- Species: D. bernhauerorum

Binomial name
- Dorcadion bernhauerorum Peks, 2010

Species of beetle

Dorcadion bernhauerorum is a species of beetle in the family Cerambycidae. It was described by Peks in 2010.
