= Dorcadion haemorrhoidale =

Scientific classification
- Kingdom: Animalia
- Phylum: Arthropoda
- Clade: Pancrustacea
- Class: Insecta
- Order: Coleoptera
- Suborder: Polyphaga
- Infraorder: Cucujiformia
- Family: Cerambycidae
- Genus: Dorcadion
- Species: D. haemorrhoidale

Binomial name
- Dorcadion haemorrhoidale Hampe, 1852

Species of beetle

Dorcadion haemorrhoidale is a species of beetle in the family Cerambycidae. It was described by Hampe in 1852. It is known from Turkey, Armenia and Iran.
