= Dorcadion beckeri =

Scientific classification
- Kingdom: Animalia
- Phylum: Arthropoda
- Clade: Pancrustacea
- Class: Insecta
- Order: Coleoptera
- Suborder: Polyphaga
- Infraorder: Cucujiformia
- Family: Cerambycidae
- Genus: Dorcadion
- Species: D. beckeri

Binomial name
- Dorcadion beckeri Kraatz, 1873

Species of beetle

Dorcadion beckeri is a species of beetle in the family Cerambycidae. It was described by Kraatz in 1873.

== Subspecies ==
- Dorcadion beckeri beckeri Kraatz, 1873
- Dorcadion beckeri koenigi Jakovlev, 1897
