= Dorcadion axillare =

Scientific classification
- Kingdom: Animalia
- Phylum: Arthropoda
- Clade: Pancrustacea
- Class: Insecta
- Order: Coleoptera
- Suborder: Polyphaga
- Infraorder: Cucujiformia
- Family: Cerambycidae
- Genus: Dorcadion
- Species: D. axillare

Binomial name
- Dorcadion axillare Küster, 1847

Synonyms
- Dorcadion arenarium axillare (Küster) Depoli, 1915; Dorcadion litigiosum var. varnanum Pic, 1926; Dorcadion pedestre var. axillare (Küster) Kraatz, 1871; Pedestredorcadion axillare (Küster) Sama, 2002

Species of beetle

Dorcadion axillare is a species of beetle in the family Cerambycidae. It was described by Küster in 1847. It is known from Bulgaria and Romania. It has two subspecies: Dorcadion axillare axillare Küster, 1847 and Dorcadion axillare moldavicum Dascălu & Fusu, 2012
