= Dorcadion pararenarium =

Scientific classification
- Kingdom: Animalia
- Phylum: Arthropoda
- Clade: Pancrustacea
- Class: Insecta
- Order: Coleoptera
- Suborder: Polyphaga
- Infraorder: Cucujiformia
- Family: Cerambycidae
- Genus: Dorcadion
- Species: D. pararenarium

Binomial name
- Dorcadion pararenarium Breuning, 1969

Species of beetle

Dorcadion pararenarium is a species of beetle in the family Cerambycidae described by Breuning in 1969.
