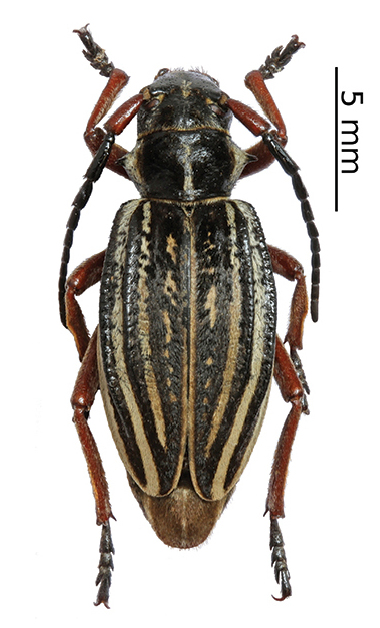

Scientific classification
- Kingdom: Animalia
- Phylum: Arthropoda
- Clade: Pancrustacea
- Class: Insecta
- Order: Coleoptera
- Suborder: Polyphaga
- Infraorder: Cucujiformia
- Family: Cerambycidae
- Genus: Dorcadion
- Species: D. acutispinum

Binomial name
- Dorcadion acutispinum Motschulsky, 1860

= Dorcadion acutispinum =

Species of beetle

Dorcadion acutispinum is a species of beetle in the family Cerambycidae. It was described by Victor Motschulsky in 1860. It is known from Kazakhstan and China.

== See also ==
- Dorcadion
