= Dorcadion pusillum =

Scientific classification
- Kingdom: Animalia
- Phylum: Arthropoda
- Clade: Pancrustacea
- Class: Insecta
- Order: Coleoptera
- Suborder: Polyphaga
- Infraorder: Cucujiformia
- Family: Cerambycidae
- Genus: Dorcadion
- Species: D. pusillum

Binomial name
- Dorcadion pusillum Küster, 1847

Species of beetle

Dorcadion pusillum is a species of longhorn beetle of the subfamily Lamiinae.

== Description ==
The length of the adults is 8–10 millimetres (0.31–0.39 in). The first segment of the antennae and legs is reddish brown. The back and shoulder are striped and dull, and the color is either gray or pale brown. The suture and manifold are bright white. There is a black stripe on the bugs spine. The elytron is with dark round spots.

== Subspecies ==
- Dorcadion pusillum pusillum Küster, 1847
- Dorcadion pusillum berladense Pic, 1903
- Dorcadion pusillum tanaiticum Kasatkin, 2002
- Dorcadion pusillum ochrolineatum Dascălu, 2018
- Dorcadion pusillum vasiliscus Dascălu, 2018
