= Dorcadion olympicum =

Scientific classification
- Kingdom: Animalia
- Phylum: Arthropoda
- Clade: Pancrustacea
- Class: Insecta
- Order: Coleoptera
- Suborder: Polyphaga
- Infraorder: Cucujiformia
- Family: Cerambycidae
- Genus: Dorcadion
- Species: D. olympicum

Binomial name
- Dorcadion olympicum Kraatz, 1873

Synonyms
- Dorcadion graecum (Waltl) Kraatz, 1873; ?Dorcadion obsoletum Kraatz, 1873

Species of beetle

Dorcadion olympicum is a species of beetle in the family Cerambycidae. It was described by Kraatz in 1873. It is known from Turkey.

== Subspecies ==
- Dorcadion olympicum convexum Breuning, 1943
- Dorcadion olympicum flavosuturale Krätschmer, 1987
- Dorcadion olympicum olympicum Kraatz, 1873
