= Dorcadion darjae =

Scientific classification
- Kingdom: Animalia
- Phylum: Arthropoda
- Clade: Pancrustacea
- Class: Insecta
- Order: Coleoptera
- Suborder: Polyphaga
- Infraorder: Cucujiformia
- Family: Cerambycidae
- Genus: Dorcadion
- Species: D. darjae

Binomial name
- Dorcadion darjae Danilevsky, 2001

Species of beetle

Dorcadion darjae is a species of beetle in the family Cerambycidae. It was described by Mikhail Leontievich Danilevsky in 2001.

The species can be traced to Central Asia.
