= Dorcadion nitidum =

Scientific classification
- Kingdom: Animalia
- Phylum: Arthropoda
- Clade: Pancrustacea
- Class: Insecta
- Order: Coleoptera
- Suborder: Polyphaga
- Infraorder: Cucujiformia
- Family: Cerambycidae
- Genus: Dorcadion
- Species: D. nitidum

Binomial name
- Dorcadion nitidum Motschulsky, 1838

Species of beetle

Dorcadion nitidum is a species of beetle in the family Cerambycidae. It was described by Victor Motschulsky in 1838. It is known from Turkey and Armenia.

== Varieties ==
- Dorcadion nitidum var. bifuscovittatum Breuning, 1946
- Dorcadion nitidum var. multialbovittatum Breuning, 1946
- Dorcadion nitidum var. suturatum Ferreira, 1864
- Dorcadion nitidum var. trifuscovittatum Breuning, 1946
