= Dorcadion nigrostriatum =

Scientific classification
- Kingdom: Animalia
- Phylum: Arthropoda
- Clade: Pancrustacea
- Class: Insecta
- Order: Coleoptera
- Suborder: Polyphaga
- Infraorder: Cucujiformia
- Family: Cerambycidae
- Genus: Dorcadion
- Species: D. nigrostriatum

Binomial name
- Dorcadion nigrostriatum Adlbauer, 1982

Species of beetle

Dorcadion nigrostriatum is a species of beetle in the family Cerambycidae. It was described by Adlbauer in 1982. It is known from Turkey.
