= Dorcadion pittinorum =

Scientific classification
- Kingdom: Animalia
- Phylum: Arthropoda
- Clade: Pancrustacea
- Class: Insecta
- Order: Coleoptera
- Suborder: Polyphaga
- Infraorder: Cucujiformia
- Family: Cerambycidae
- Genus: Dorcadion
- Species: D. pittinorum

Binomial name
- Dorcadion pittinorum Pesarini & Sabbadini, 1998

Species of beetle

Dorcadion pittinorum is a species of beetle in the family Cerambycidae. It was described by Pesarini and Sabbadini in 1998. It is known from Turkey.
