= Dorcadion semilucens =

Scientific classification
- Kingdom: Animalia
- Phylum: Arthropoda
- Clade: Pancrustacea
- Class: Insecta
- Order: Coleoptera
- Suborder: Polyphaga
- Infraorder: Cucujiformia
- Family: Cerambycidae
- Genus: Dorcadion
- Species: D. semilucens

Binomial name
- Dorcadion semilucens Kraatz, 1873

Synonyms
- Dorcadion scabricolle mesmini Pic, 1903

Species of beetle

Dorcadion semilucens is a species of beetle in the family Cerambycidae. It was described by Kraatz in 1873. It is known from Armenia and Azerbaijan. It contains the varietas Dorcadion semilucens var. lactescens.
