= Dorcadion narlianum =

Scientific classification
- Kingdom: Animalia
- Phylum: Arthropoda
- Clade: Pancrustacea
- Class: Insecta
- Order: Coleoptera
- Suborder: Polyphaga
- Infraorder: Cucujiformia
- Family: Cerambycidae
- Genus: Dorcadion
- Species: D. narlianum

Binomial name
- Dorcadion narlianum Özdikmen, Mercan & Cihan, 2012

Species of beetle

Dorcadion narlianum is a species of beetle in the family Cerambycidae. It was described by Özdikmen, Mercan and Cihan in 2012. It is known from Turkey.

== See also ==
- Dorcadion
