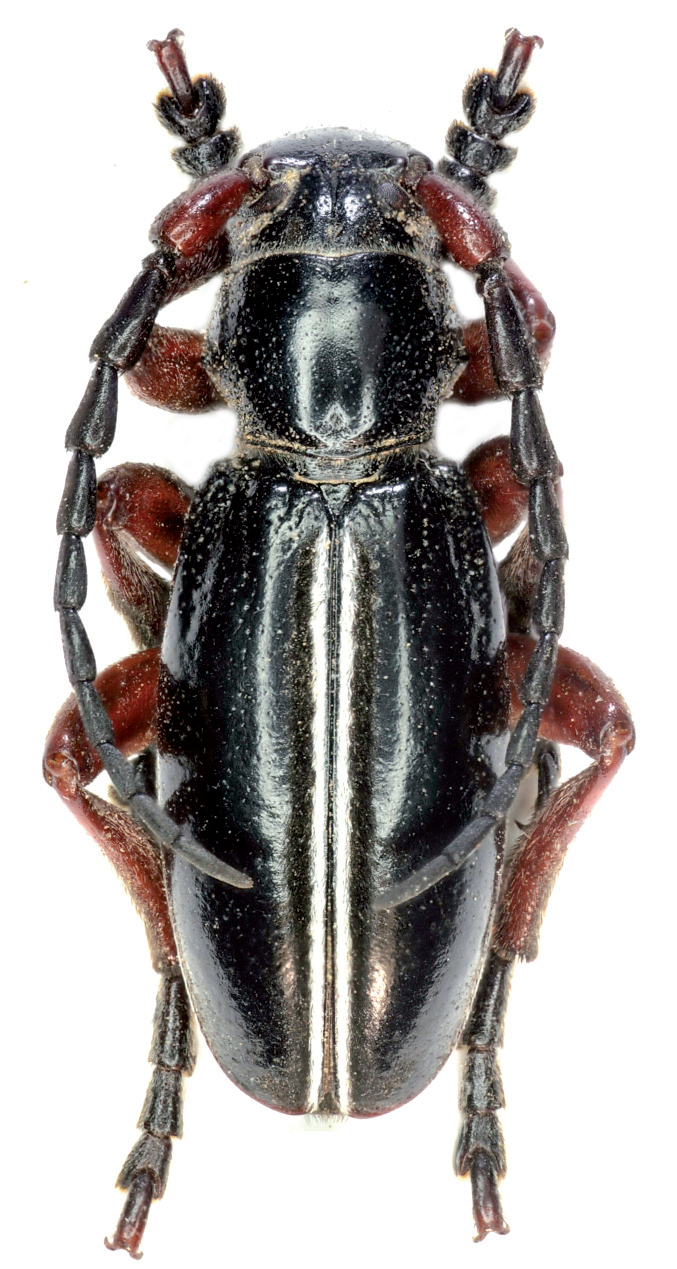
- Dorcadion sisianense Lazarev, 2009 (male, holotype)

Scientific classification
- Kingdom: Animalia
- Phylum: Arthropoda
- Clade: Pancrustacea
- Class: Insecta
- Order: Coleoptera
- Suborder: Polyphaga
- Infraorder: Cucujiformia
- Family: Cerambycidae
- Genus: Dorcadion
- Species: D. sisianense

Binomial name
- Dorcadion sisianense Lazarev, 2009

= Dorcadion sisianense =

Species of beetle

Dorcadion sisianense is a species of beetle in the family Cerambycidae. It was described by Lazarev in 2009. It is known from Armenia.

== Name ==
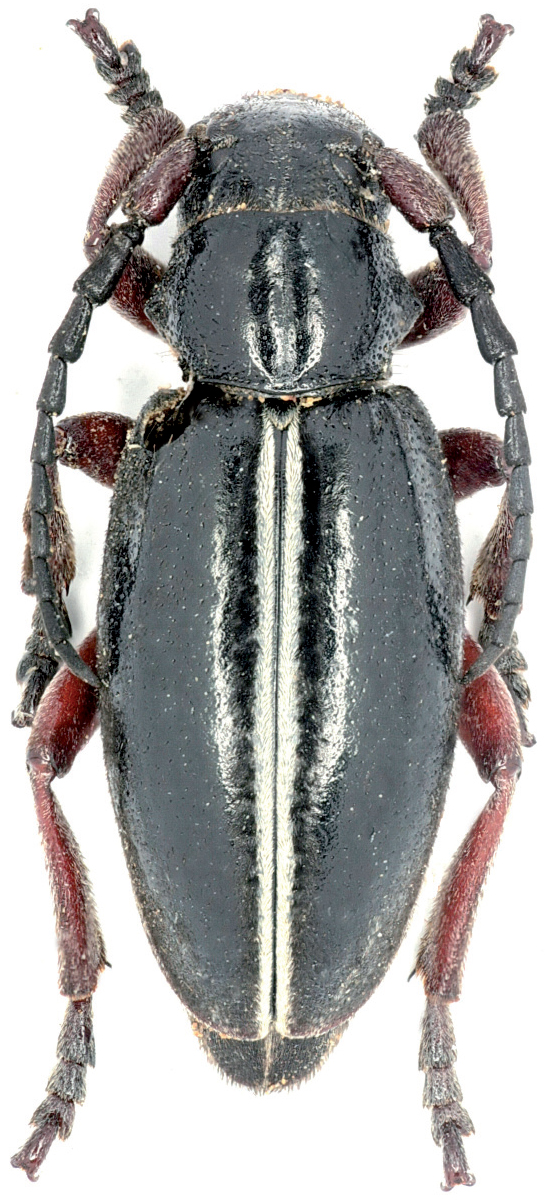
Dorcadion sisianense Lazarev, 2009 (female, paratype)

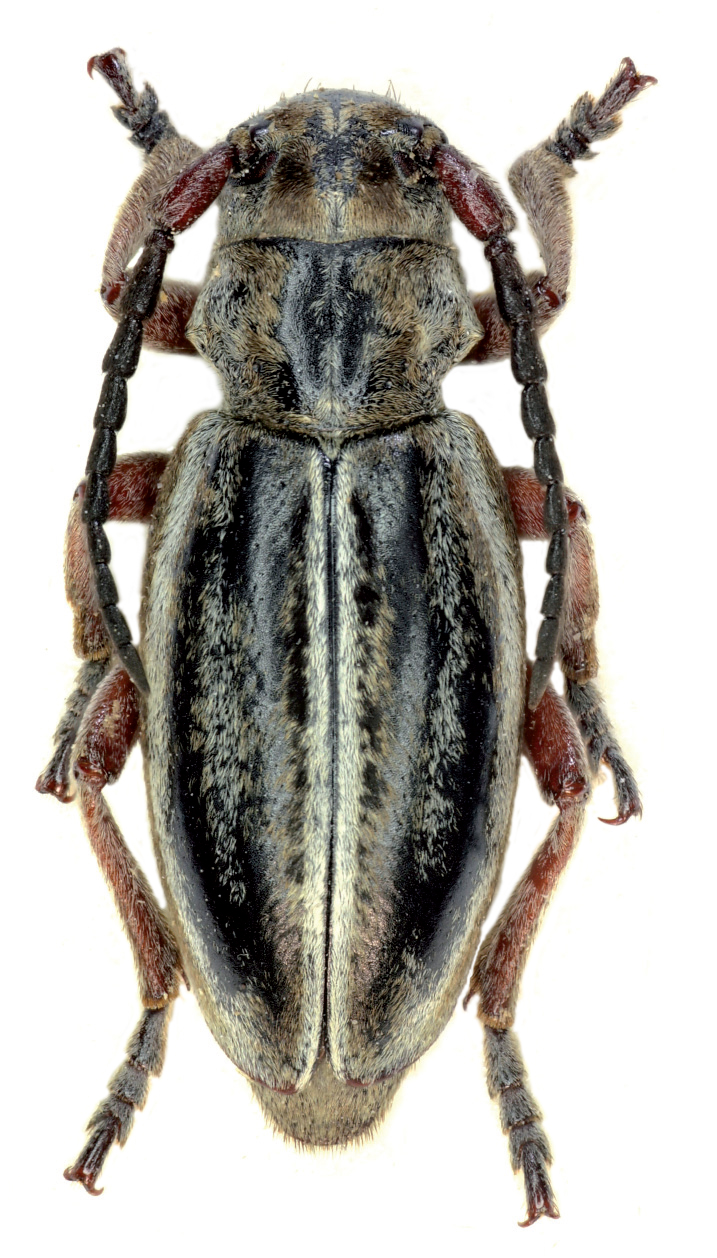
Dorcadion sisianense Lazarev, 2009 (female, paratype)

Dorcadion sisianense Lazarev, 2009: 210

Type locality: Armenia, Sisian Pass, 2 km W Gorajk, 39°40′N 45°45′E, 2000 m.

Holotype: Coll. Danilevsky. male, Armenia, Sisian Pass, 2 km W Gorajk, 2000 m, 39°40′N 45°45′E, 25.6.2003, M. Danilevsky leg.

== Links ==
- Tavakilian, G. & Chevillotte, H.: TITAN: Cerambycidae database.
- Danilevsky, M. & Lazarev, M.: http://cerambycidae.net/.
- Zenodo PDF
- Media related to Dorcadion sisianense at Wikimedia Commons
- Data related to Dorcadion sisianense at Wikispecies
