= Dorcadion glaucum =

Scientific classification
- Kingdom: Animalia
- Phylum: Arthropoda
- Clade: Pancrustacea
- Class: Insecta
- Order: Coleoptera
- Suborder: Polyphaga
- Infraorder: Cucujiformia
- Family: Cerambycidae
- Genus: Dorcadion
- Species: D. glaucum

Binomial name
- Dorcadion glaucum Faldermann, 1837

Synonyms
- Pedestredorcadion glaucum glaucum (Faldermann) Villiers, 1967

Species of beetle

Dorcadion glaucum is a species of beetle in the family Cerambycidae. It was described by Faldermann in 1837. It is known from Azerbaijan and Iran.

== Subspecies ==
- Dorcadion glaucum glaucum Faldermann, 1837
- Dorcadion glaucum lassallei Lazarev, 2015
- Dorcadion glaucum murzinianus Lazarev, 2015
