= Dorcadion kartalense =

Scientific classification
- Kingdom: Animalia
- Phylum: Arthropoda
- Class: Insecta
- Order: Coleoptera
- Suborder: Polyphaga
- Infraorder: Cucujiformia
- Family: Cerambycidae
- Genus: Dorcadion
- Species: D. kartalense

Binomial name
- Dorcadion kartalense Lazarev, 2016

Species of beetle

Dorcadion sisianense is a species of beetle in the family Cerambycidae. It was described by Lazarev in 2016. It is known from Turkey.

== Name ==
Dorcadion sisianense Lazarev, 2009: 210

Type locality: Turkey, Eskisehir provinces, Kartal Gecidi.

Holotype: Coll. Danilevsky. male, Eskisehir prov., Kartal Gecidi, 20.5.2000, P. Bialooki.

== int:Links ==
- Tavakilian, G. & Chevillotte, H.: TITAN: Cerambycidae database.
- Danilevsky, M. & Lazarev, M.: http://cerambycidae.net/.
- Zenodo PDF
- Media related to Dorcadion kartalense at Wikimedia Commons
- Data related to Dorcadion kartalense at Wikispecies
