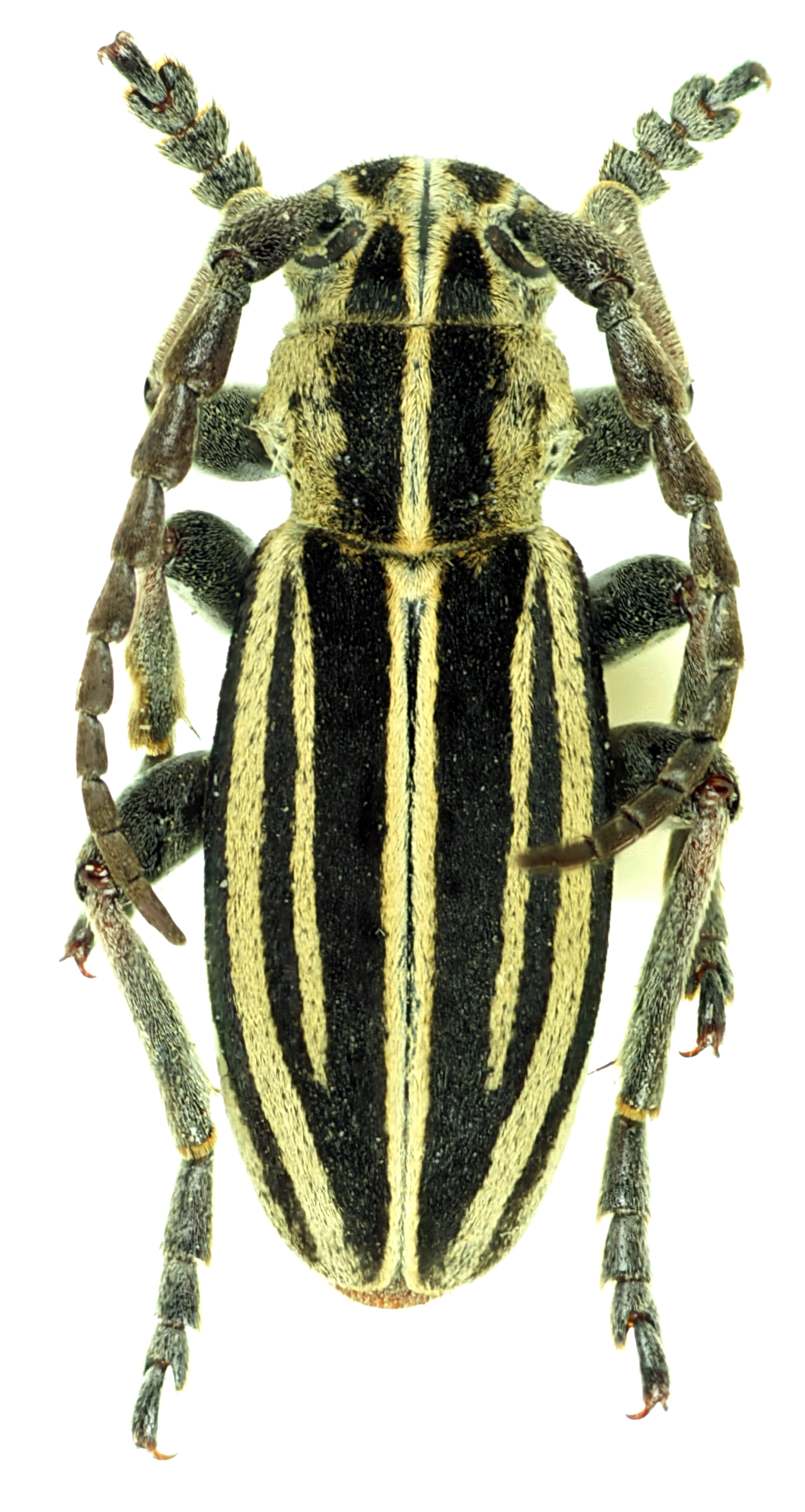
- Dorcadion ciscaucasicum abramovi (holotype)

Scientific classification
- Kingdom: Animalia
- Phylum: Arthropoda
- Clade: Pancrustacea
- Class: Insecta
- Order: Coleoptera
- Suborder: Polyphaga
- Infraorder: Cucujiformia
- Family: Cerambycidae
- Genus: Dorcadion
- Species: D. ciscaucasicum
- Subspecies: D. c. abramovi

Trinomial name
- Dorcadion ciscaucasicum abramovi Lazarev, 2009

= Dorcadion ciscaucasicum abramovi =

Subspecies of beetle

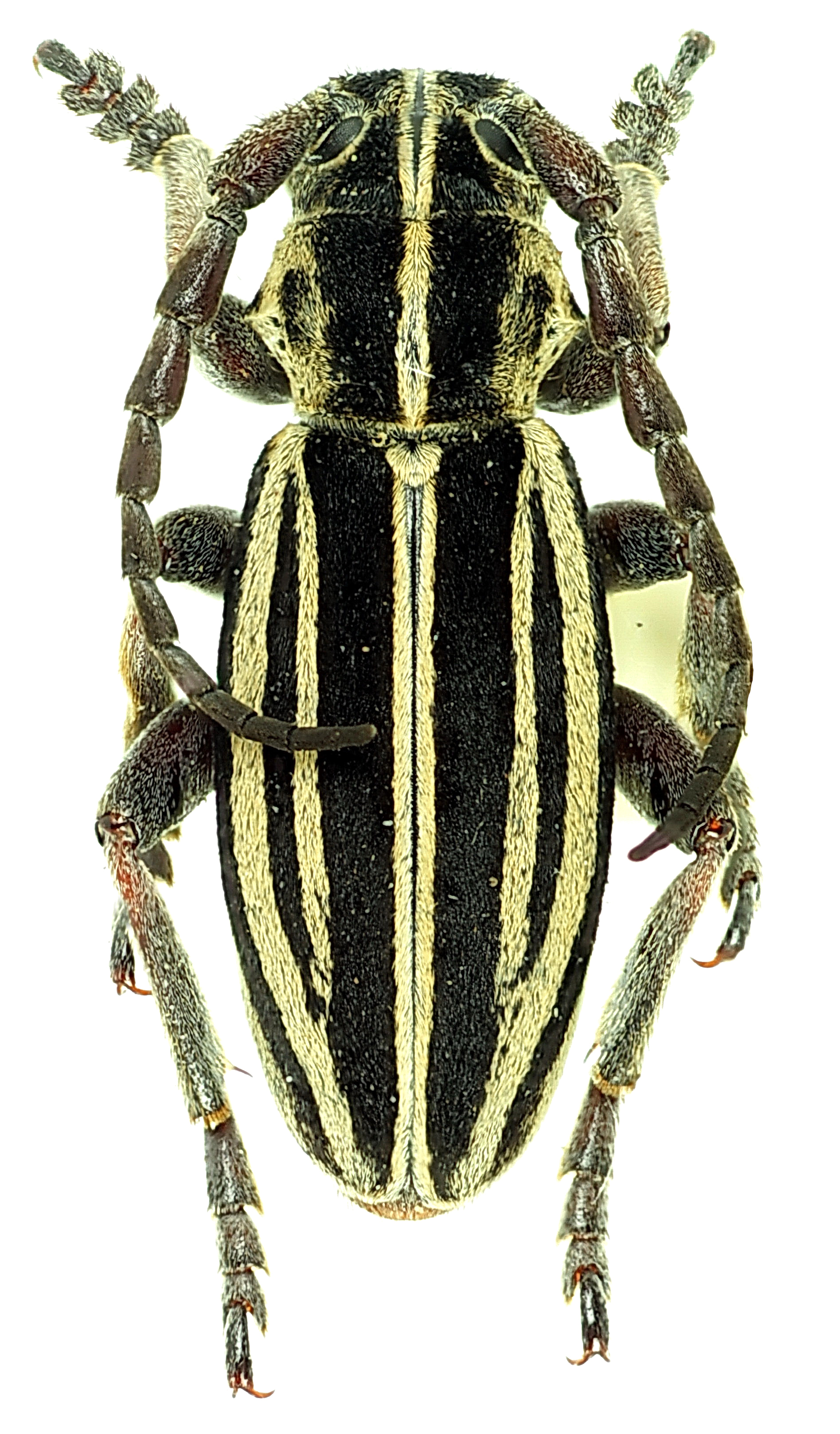
Dorcadion ciscaucasicum abramovi (paratype, male)

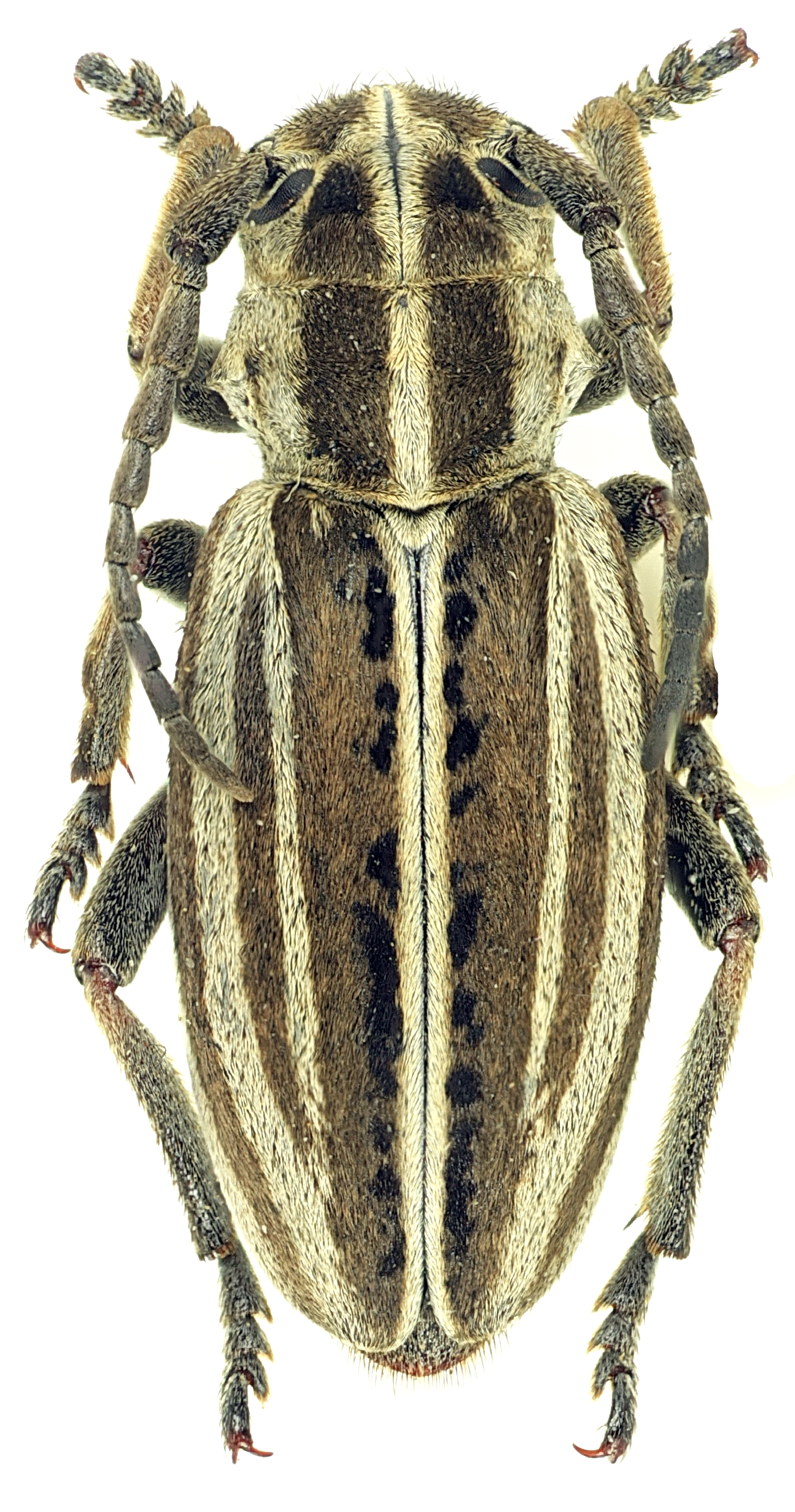
Dorcadion ciscaucasicum abramovi (paratype, female)

Dorcadion ciscaucasicum abramovi is a subspecies of beetle in the family Cerambycidae. It was described by Lazarev in 2009. It is known from Russia.

== Name ==
Dorcadion (Cribridorcadion) ciscaucasicum abramovi Lazarev, 2009: 14

Type locality: Mount Karabetova near the village of Taman, Krasnodar Territory. According to the publication and personal communication of A.E. Abramov, this population was found on the slopes of Mount Karabetov (150 m), which is 4–5 km east of Taman.

Holotype: coll. Danilevsky. male, Russia, Taman, 18–20.05.2005, A. Abramov leg.

Etymology. The new subspecies is named in honor of Andrey Evgenyevich Abramov, a connoisseur of the nature of the Krasnodar Territory, an enthusiastic collector of insects, who studied the biology of the taxa described here.
