= Dorcadion shushense =

Scientific classification
- Kingdom: Animalia
- Phylum: Arthropoda
- Clade: Pancrustacea
- Class: Insecta
- Order: Coleoptera
- Suborder: Polyphaga
- Infraorder: Cucujiformia
- Family: Cerambycidae
- Genus: Dorcadion
- Species: D. shushense

Binomial name
- Dorcadion shushense Lazarev, 2010

Species of beetle

Dorcadion shushense is a species of beetle in the family Cerambycidae. It was described by Lazarev in 2010.

== Name ==
Dorcadion shushense Lazarev, 2010: 3

Type locality: Surroundings of Shushi in Nagorno-Karabakh.

Holotype: Coll. Danilevsky. male with two labels: 1) «Shusha, Elizavetp. g., 1905» [Russian]; 2) «HOLOTYPUS Dorcadion (Cribridorcadion) SHUSHENSE sp.n. M. Lazarev det., 2010».

== int:Links ==
- Tavakilian, G. & Chevillotte, H.: TITAN: Cerambycidae database.
- Danilevsky, M. & Lazarev, M.: http://cerambycidae.net/.
- Zenodo PDF
- Eversmannia PDF
- Media related to Dorcadion shushense at Wikimedia Commons
- Data related to Dorcadion shushense at Wikispecies
