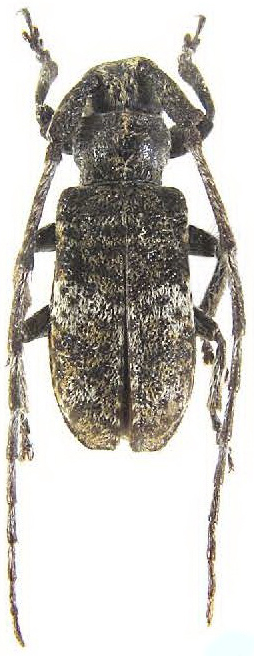
- Dorcadion taibaishana Lazarev, 2021 (male, holotype)

Scientific classification
- Kingdom: Animalia
- Phylum: Arthropoda
- Class: Insecta
- Order: Coleoptera
- Suborder: Polyphaga
- Infraorder: Cucujiformia
- Family: Cerambycidae
- Genus: Falsomesosella
- Species: F. taibaishana

Binomial name
- Falsomesosella taibaishana Lazarev, 2021

= Falsomesosella taibaishana =

Species of beetle

Falsomesosella taibaishana is a species of beetle in the family Cerambycidae. It was described by Lazarev in 2021. It is known from China.

== Name ==
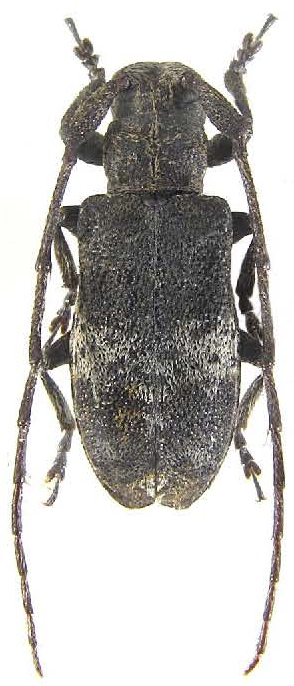
Falsomesosella taibaishana Lazarev, 2021 (Paratype, female)

Dorcadion sisianense Lazarev, 2021: 142,

Type locality: China, Shaanxi province, Taibaishan National Park, 1350 m.
Holotype: Coll. Lazarev. male, China, Shaanxi province, Taibaishan National Park, 1350 m, 10.06.1999, S. Murzin leg.
Etymology: The species is named after the name of the type locality — Taibaishan Mountain Range.

== Links ==
- Tavakilian, G. & Chevillotte, H.: TITAN: Cerambycidae database.
- Danilevsky, M. & Lazarev, M.: http://cerambycidae.net/.
- Zenodo PDF 2021
- Zenodo PDF 2024
- Media related to Falsomesosella taibaishana at Wikimedia Commons
- Data related to Falsomesosella taibaishana at Wikispecies
