= Dorcadion paramicans paramicans =

Scientific classification
- Kingdom: Animalia
- Phylum: Arthropoda
- Class: Insecta
- Order: Coleoptera
- Suborder: Polyphaga
- Infraorder: Cucujiformia
- Family: Cerambycidae
- Genus: Dorcadion
- Species: D. paramicans
- Subspecies: D. p. paramicans

Trinomial name
- Dorcadion paramicans paramicans Lazarev, 2016

Subspecies of beetle

Dorcadion (Cribridorcadion) paramicans paramicans is a subspecies of beetle in the family Cerambycidae. It was described by Lazarev in 2016. It is known from Turkey.

== Name ==
Dorcadion paramicans paramicans Lazarev, 2016: 211. Type locality: Turkey: Çorum prov., 14 km N Alaca, 1100 m. Holotype: Coll. Lazarev. male, Turkey, Çorum prov., 14 km N Alaca, 1100 m, 07.04.1977, W.Heinz leg.
