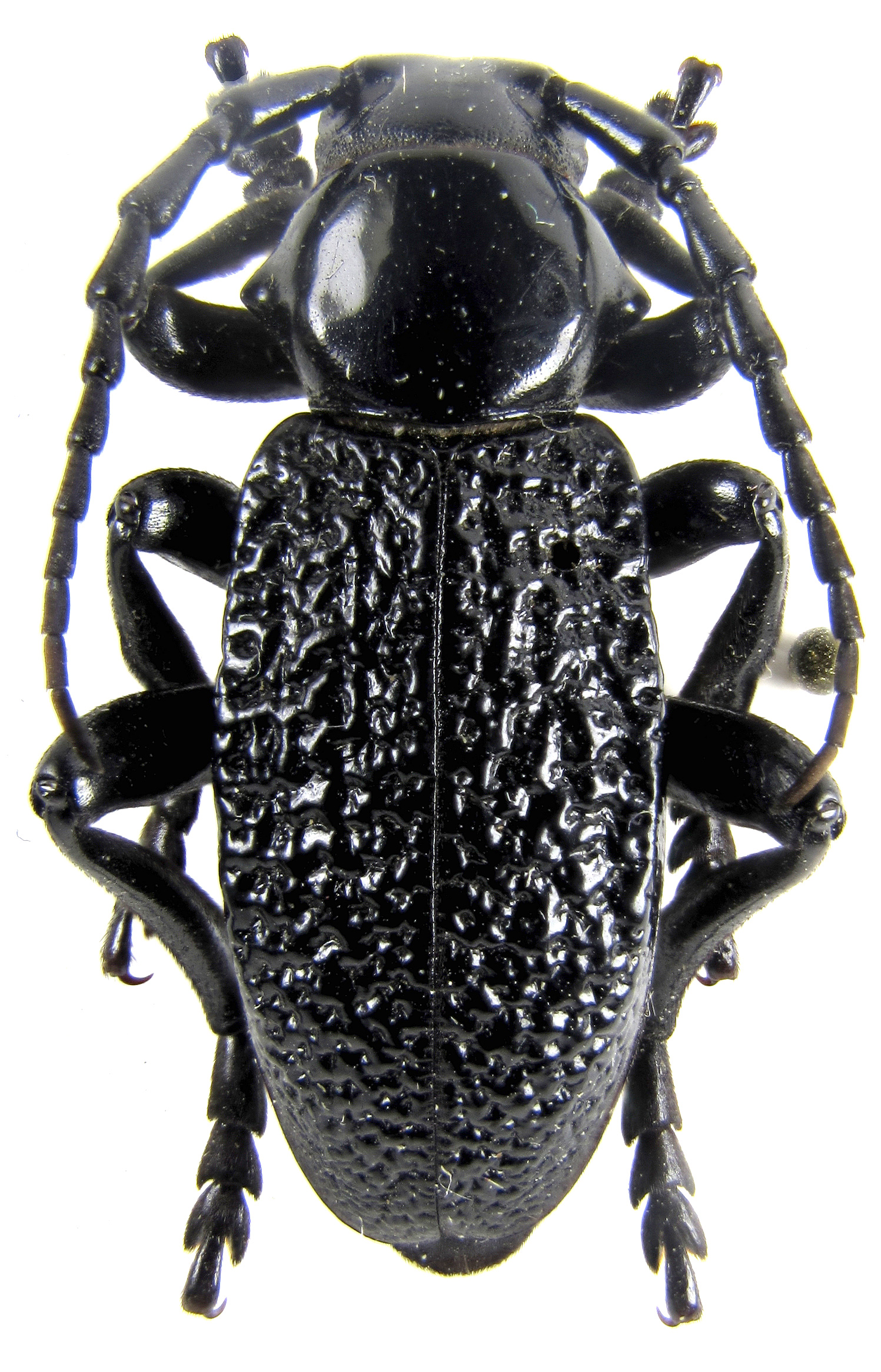
- Dorcadion mniszechii cavernosum Lazarev, 2014 (Holotype)

Scientific classification
- Kingdom: Animalia
- Phylum: Arthropoda
- Clade: Pancrustacea
- Class: Insecta
- Order: Coleoptera
- Suborder: Polyphaga
- Infraorder: Cucujiformia
- Family: Cerambycidae
- Genus: Dorcadion
- Species: D. mniszechi
- Subspecies: D. m. cavernosum

Trinomial name
- Dorcadion mniszechi cavernosum Lazarev, 2014

= Dorcadion mniszechi cavernosum =

Subspecies of beetle

Dorcadion (Cribridorcadion) mniszechi cavernosum is a subspecies of beetle in the family Cerambycidae. It was described by Lazarev in 2014. It is known from Armenia.

== Name ==
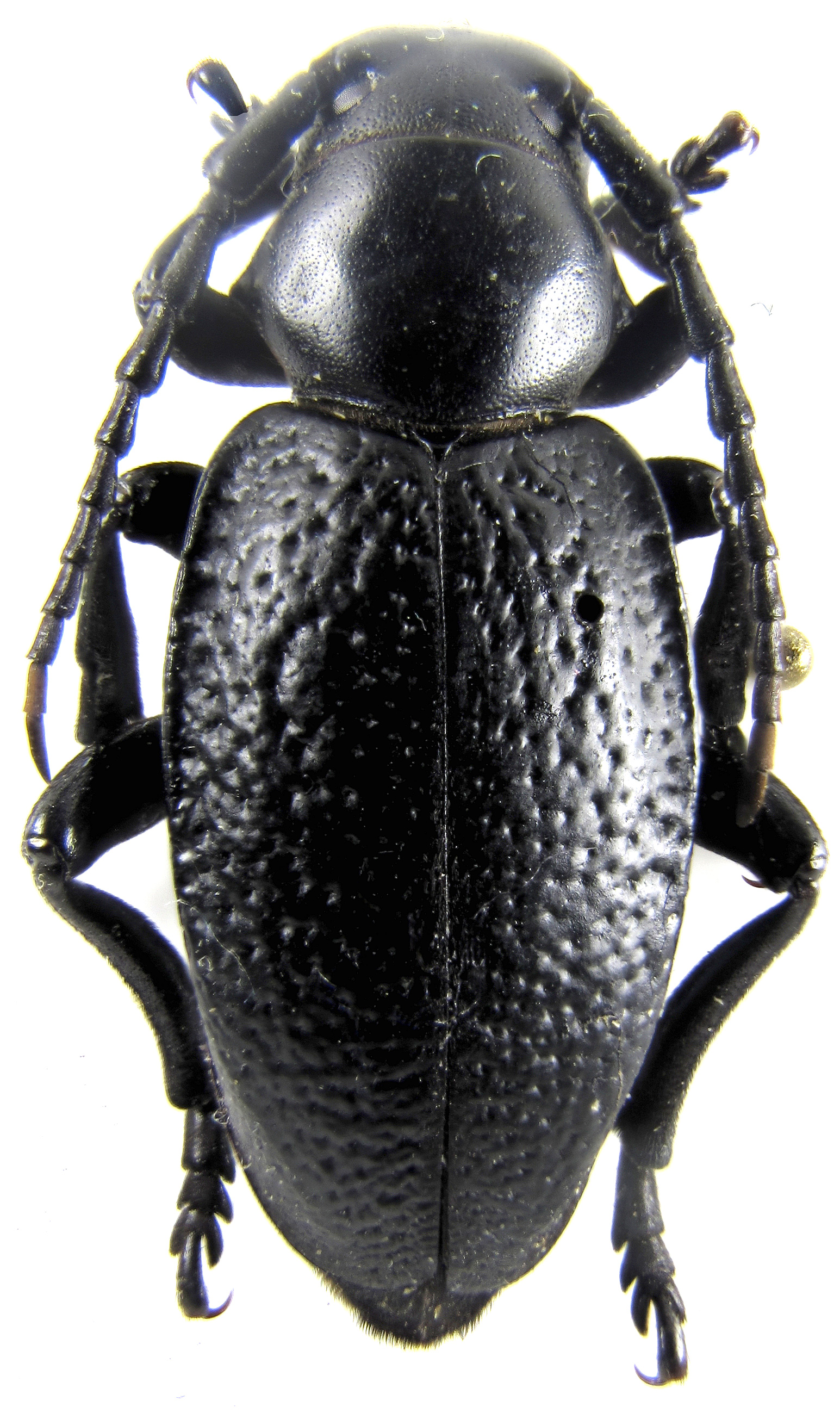
Dorcadion mniszechi cavernosum Lazarev, 2014 (Paratype, female)

Dorcadion (Cribridorcadion) mniszechi cavernosum Lazarev, 2014: 701

Type locality: Armenia: Arteni environs (40°17′50″N 43°45′47″E).
Holotype: Coll. Danilevsky. male, Arm. SSR, Arteni, 18.05.1983, M.Danilevsky leg.
