= Dorcadion paramicans =

Scientific classification
- Kingdom: Animalia
- Phylum: Arthropoda
- Class: Insecta
- Order: Coleoptera
- Suborder: Polyphaga
- Infraorder: Cucujiformia
- Family: Cerambycidae
- Genus: Dorcadion
- Species: D. paramicans

Binomial name
- Dorcadion paramicans Lazarev, 2016

Species of beetle

Dorcadion (Cribridorcadion) paramicans is a species of beetle in the family Cerambycidae. It was described by Lazarev in 2016. It is known from Turkey.

== Subspecies ==
- Dorcadion paramicans kalechikense Lazarev, 2016
- Dorcadion paramicans keskiense Lazarev, 2016
- Dorcadion paramicans paramicans Lazarev, 2016

== Name ==
Dorcadion paramicans Lazarev, 2016: 210.

== Distribution ==
- Turkey, Central Anatolia.

== int:Links ==
- Tavakilian, G. & Chevillotte, H.: TITAN: Cerambycidae database.
- Danilevsky, M. & Lazarev, M.: http://cerambycidae.net/.
- Zenodo PDF
- Data related to Dorcadion paramicans at Wikispecies
- Media related to Dorcadion paramicans at Wikimedia Commons
