= Dorcadion paramicans keskiense =

Scientific classification
- Kingdom: Animalia
- Phylum: Arthropoda
- Class: Insecta
- Order: Coleoptera
- Suborder: Polyphaga
- Infraorder: Cucujiformia
- Family: Cerambycidae
- Genus: Dorcadion
- Species: D. paramicans
- Subspecies: D. p. keskiense

Trinomial name
- Dorcadion paramicans keskiense Lazarev, 2016

Subspecies of beetle

Dorcadion (Cribridorcadion) paramicans keskiense is a subspecies of beetle in the family Cerambycidae. It was described by Lazarev in 2016. It is known from Turkey.

== Name ==
Dorcadion paramicans keskiense Lazarev, 2016: 212. Type locality: Turkey, Kirikkale prov., Keskin, 1400 m. Holotype: Coll. Lazarev. male, Turkey, Kirikkale prov., Keskin, 1400 m, 7.4.1976, W. Heinz leg.
