= Dorcadion rarepunctatum =

Scientific classification
- Kingdom: Animalia
- Phylum: Arthropoda
- Class: Insecta
- Order: Coleoptera
- Suborder: Polyphaga
- Infraorder: Cucujiformia
- Family: Cerambycidae
- Genus: Dorcadion
- Species: D. rarepunctatum

Binomial name
- Dorcadion rarepunctatum Lazarev, 2016

Species of beetle

Dorcadion (Cribridorcadion) rarepunctatum is a species of beetle in the family Cerambycidae. It was described by Lazarev in 2016. It is known from Turkey.

== Name ==
Dorcadion rarepunctatum Lazarev, 2016: 216

- Type locality: Turkey, prov. Kayseri, about 4 km westwards Sariz, 1700 m, about 38°28′52″N 36°28′29″E.
- Holotype: Coll. Lazarev. male, Turkey, prov. Kayseri, W Sariz, 1700 m, 25.4.1989, W.Heinz leg.
