= Falsomesosella densepunctata =

Scientific classification
- Kingdom: Animalia
- Phylum: Arthropoda
- Class: Insecta
- Order: Coleoptera
- Suborder: Polyphaga
- Infraorder: Cucujiformia
- Family: Cerambycidae
- Genus: Falsomesosella
- Species: F. densepunctata

Binomial name
- Falsomesosella densepunctata Breuning, 1968

Synonyms
- Falsomesosella densepunctata Breuning, 1968; Gyarancita rondoni Breuning, 1963

Species of beetle

Falsomesosella densepunctata is a species of beetle in the family Cerambycidae. It was described by Stephan von Breuning in 1968, originally under the genus Gyarancita. It is known from Laos.
