= Dorcadion paramicans kalechikense =

Scientific classification
- Kingdom: Animalia
- Phylum: Arthropoda
- Class: Insecta
- Order: Coleoptera
- Suborder: Polyphaga
- Infraorder: Cucujiformia
- Family: Cerambycidae
- Genus: Dorcadion
- Species: D. paramicans
- Subspecies: D. p. kalechikense

Trinomial name
- Dorcadion paramicans kalechikense Lazarev, 2016

Subspecies of beetle

Dorcadion (Cribridorcadion) paramicans kalechikense is a subspecies of beetle in the family Cerambycidae. It was described by Lazarev in 2016. It is known from Turkey.

== Name ==
Dorcadion paramicans kalechikense Lazarev, 2016: 212. Type locality: Turkey, Ankara prov., Kozayagi NW Kalecik, 1200 m.
Holotype: Coll. Danilevsky. male, Turkey, Ankara prov., Kozayagi NW Kalecik, 1200 m, 1.V.1976, W. Heinz leg.
