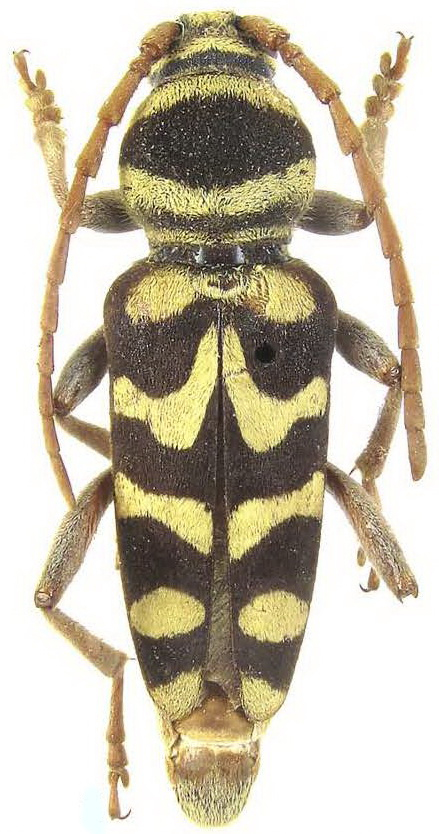
- Neoplagionotus karmelicola Lazarev, 2022 (Holotype, ♂)

Scientific classification
- Kingdom: Animalia
- Phylum: Arthropoda
- Class: Insecta
- Order: Coleoptera
- Suborder: Polyphaga
- Infraorder: Cucujiformia
- Family: Cerambycidae
- Genus: Neoplagionotus
- Species: N. karmelicola

Binomial name
- Neoplagionotus karmelicola Lazarev, 2022

= Neoplagionotus karmelicola =

Species of beetle

Neoplagionotus karmelicola is a species of beetle in the family Cerambycidae. It was described by Lazarev in 2022. It is known from Israel and Syria.

== Name ==
The binomial name is Neoplagionotus karmelicola Lazarev, 2022 the Type locality is Israel, Karmel Mt., Haifa environs., and the Holotype is Coll. Zoological Museum of the Moscow State University. male with three labels: 1) “Syria / Haifa / Reitter”; 2) [red] “Holotype / Neoplagionotus / KARMELICOLA sp. n. / M. Lazarev det. 2022”, 3) [pink] ”Зоомузей МГУ (Москва, Россия) / № ZMMU Col 03233 / Zool. Mus. Mosq. Univ. / (Mosquae, ROSSIA) / ex coll. N. N. Plavilstshikov”.
