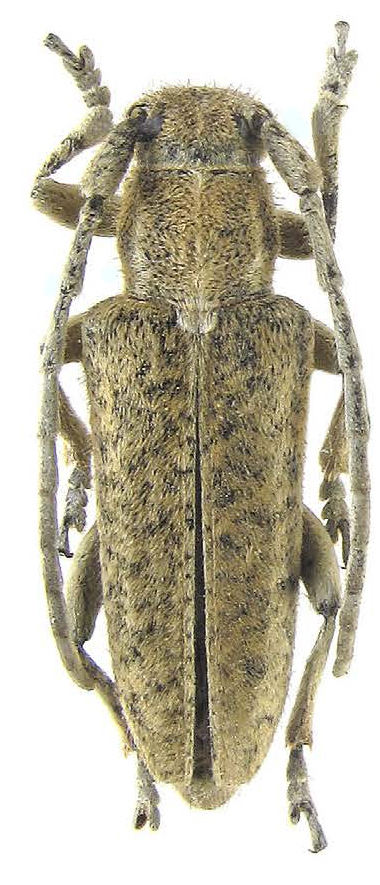
- Pilemia arida (Holotype, male).jpg

Scientific classification
- Kingdom: Animalia
- Phylum: Arthropoda
- Class: Insecta
- Order: Coleoptera
- Suborder: Polyphaga
- Infraorder: Cucujiformia
- Family: Cerambycidae
- Tribe: Phytoeciini
- Genus: Pilemia
- Species: P. arida

Binomial name
- Pilemia arida Lazarev, 2023

= Pilemia arida =

Species of beetle

Pilemia (Pseudopilemia) arida is a species of beetle in the family Cerambycidae. It was described by Lazarev in 2023. It was discovered in Jordan.

== Name ==
Pilemia (Pseudopilemia) arida Lazarev, 2023: 67

Type locality: Jordan, 14 km WSW Mādabā, Qullat Umm Rusūm Mts, 31°39′47″N 35°39′34″E, 660 m.

== Etymology ==
The name comes from the Latin “arida” - 'dry', as an essential character of the native landscape.

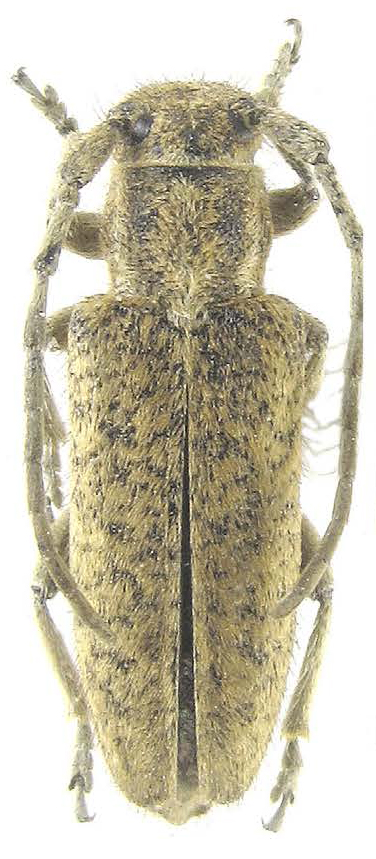
Pilemia arida (Paratype, female)

== Biology ==
Imagoes were observed in mountain semidesert on Eremostachys laciniata at the end of March and beginning of April.
