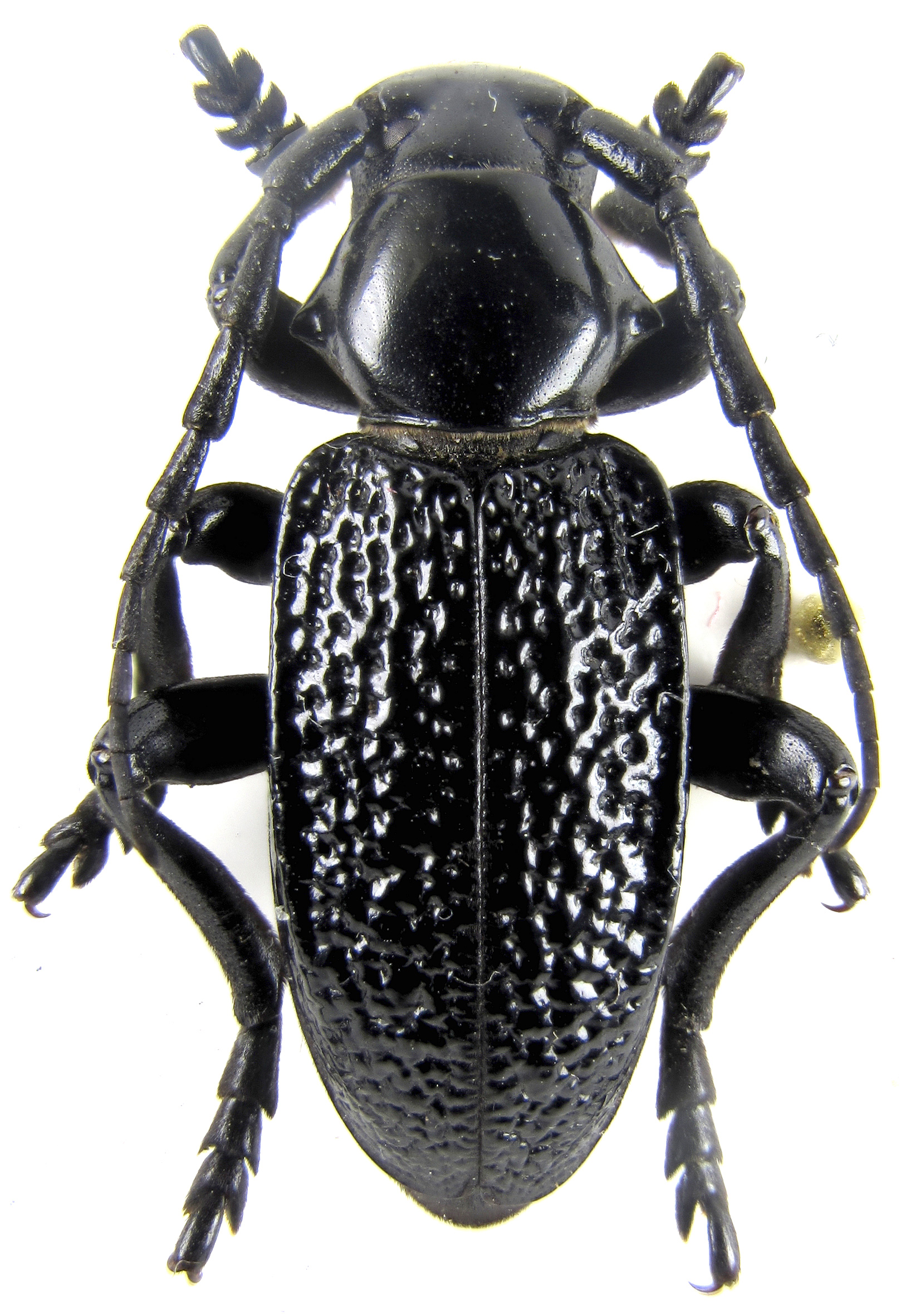
- Dorcadion mniszechi georgianum Lazarev, 2014 (Holotype)

Scientific classification
- Kingdom: Animalia
- Phylum: Arthropoda
- Clade: Pancrustacea
- Class: Insecta
- Order: Coleoptera
- Suborder: Polyphaga
- Infraorder: Cucujiformia
- Family: Cerambycidae
- Genus: Dorcadion
- Species: D. mniszechi
- Subspecies: D. m. georgianum

Trinomial name
- Dorcadion mniszechi georgianum Lazarev, 2014

= Dorcadion mniszechi georgianum =

Subspecies of beetle

Dorcadion (Cribridorcadion) mniszechi georgianum is a subspecies of beetle in the family Cerambycidae. It was described by Lazarev in 2014. It is known from Georgia.

== Name ==
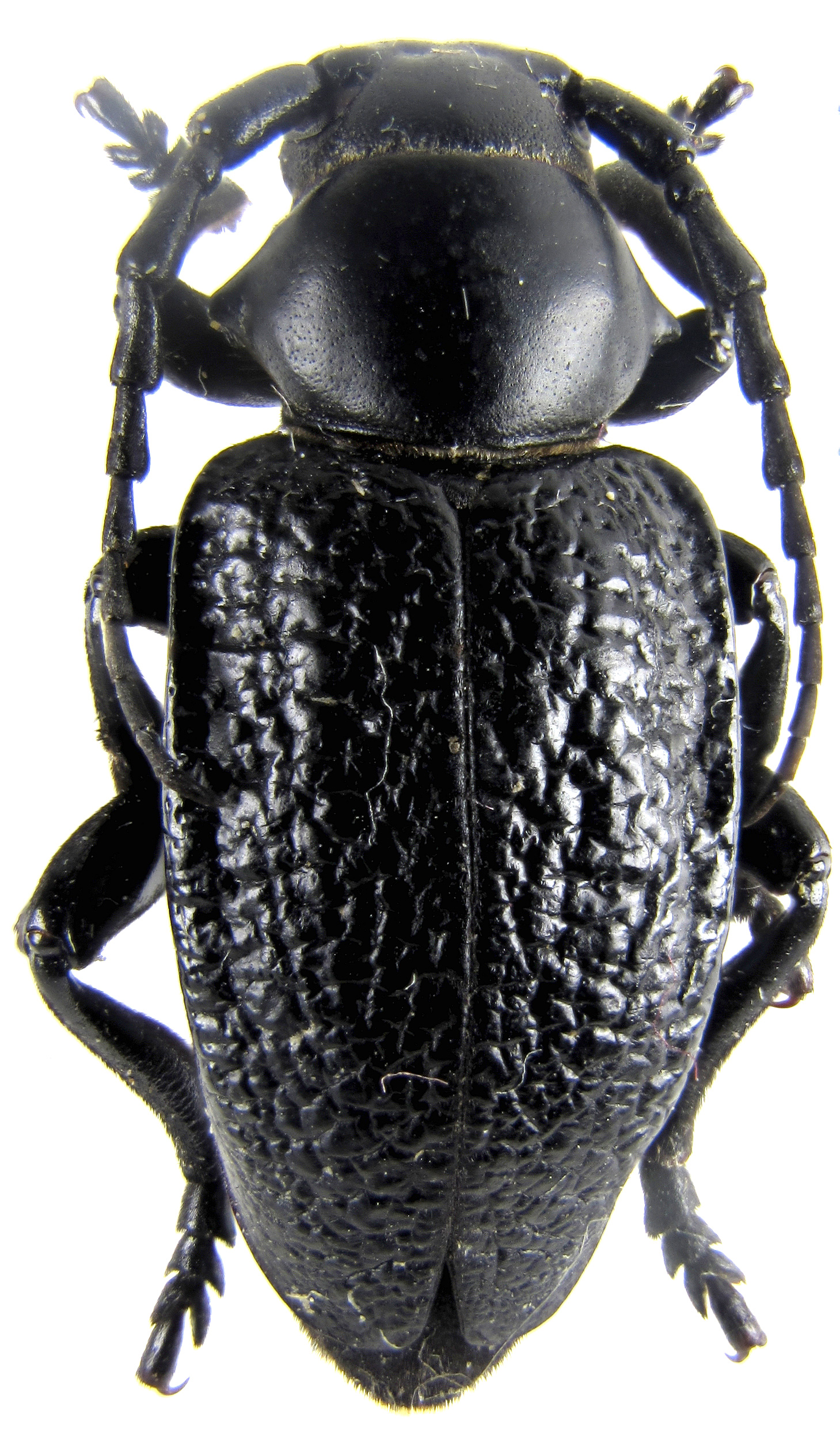
Dorcadion mniszechi georgianum Lazarev, 2014 (Paratype, female)

Dorcadion (Cribridorcadion) mniszechi georgianum Lazarev, 2014: 701

Type locality: Georgia, Grakali environs, 670 m, 41°56′59″N 44°17′34″E.

Holotype: Coll. Danilevsky. male, Gori, Grakali, 5.4.89, 600–800 m, M. Danilevsky leg.
