= Falsomesosella annamensis =

Scientific classification
- Kingdom: Animalia
- Phylum: Arthropoda
- Class: Insecta
- Order: Coleoptera
- Suborder: Polyphaga
- Infraorder: Cucujiformia
- Family: Cerambycidae
- Genus: Falsomesosella
- Species: F. annamensis

Binomial name
- Falsomesosella annamensis Breuning, 1939

Species of beetle

Falsomesosella annamensis is a species of beetle in the family Cerambycidae, described by Stephan von Breuning in 1939.
