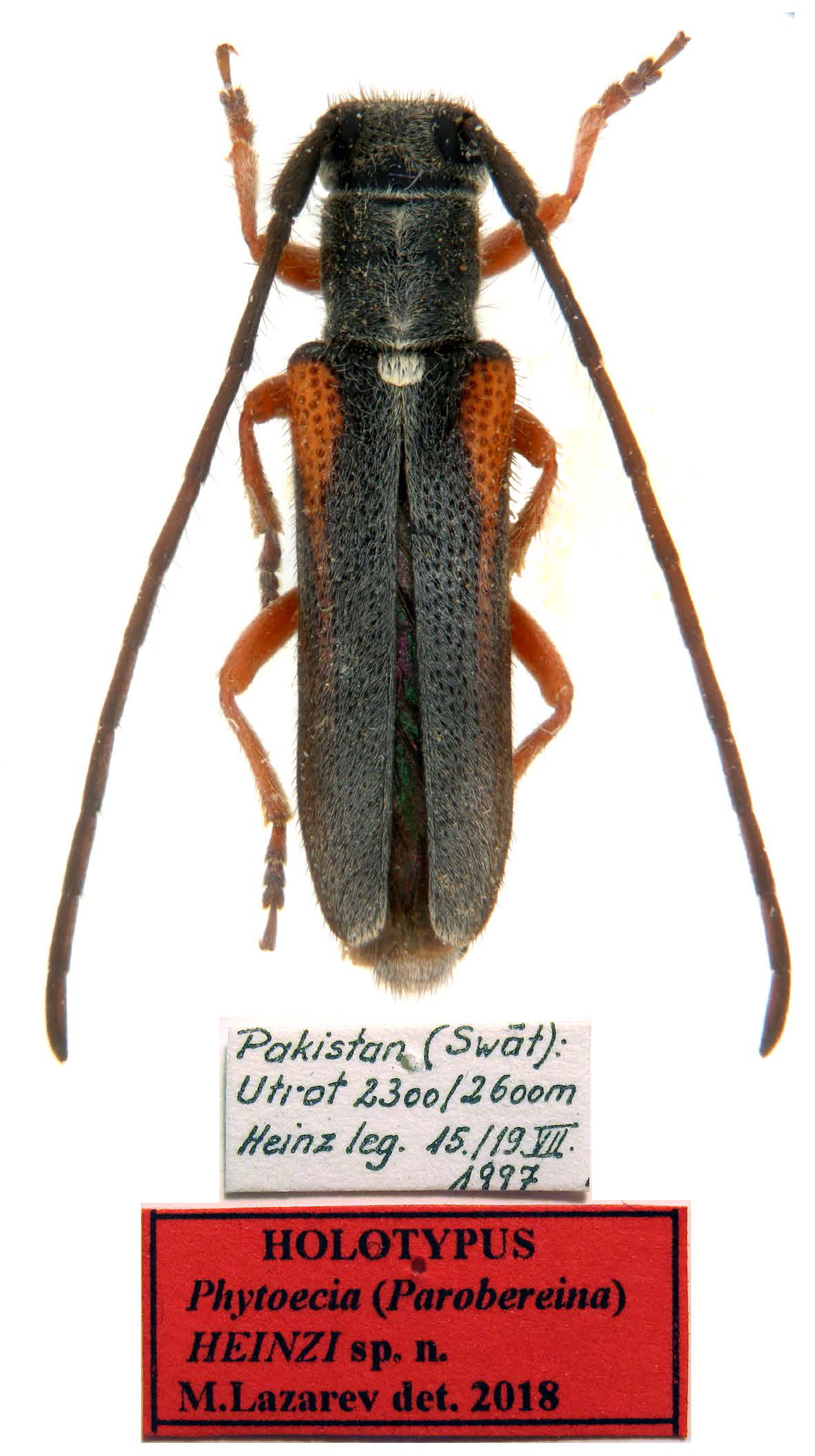
- Phytoecia (Parobereina) heinzi Lazarev, 2019 (Holotype)

Scientific classification
- Kingdom: Animalia
- Phylum: Arthropoda
- Class: Insecta
- Order: Coleoptera
- Suborder: Polyphaga
- Infraorder: Cucujiformia
- Family: Cerambycidae
- Genus: Phytoecia
- Species: P. heinzi

Binomial name
- Phytoecia heinzi Lazarev, 2019

= Phytoecia heinzi =

Species of beetle

Phytoecia heinzi is a species of beetle in the family Cerambycidae. It was described by Lazarev in 2019. It is known from Pakistan.

== Name ==
Phytoecia (Parobereina) heinzi Lazarev, 2019: 123

Type locality: Pakistan, Khyber Pakhtunkhwa province, Swat district, Utrot, about 35°29′N 72°28′E, 2300/2600 m.

Holotype: Coll. Danilevsky. male, each with 2 labels: 1) “Pakistan (Swāt): Utrot 2300/2600 m / Heinz leg. / 15/19.VII.1997”; 2) “HOLOTYPUS / Phytoecia (Parobereina) / HEINZI sp.n. / M.Lazarev det. 2019”.

Etymology. The new species is dedicated to Walter Heinz, who collected the holotype.
