= Falsomesosella glacilior =

Scientific classification
- Domain: Eukaryota
- Kingdom: Animalia
- Phylum: Arthropoda
- Class: Insecta
- Order: Coleoptera
- Suborder: Polyphaga
- Infraorder: Cucujiformia
- Family: Cerambycidae
- Genus: Falsomesosella
- Species: F. glacilior

Binomial name
- Falsomesosella glacilior (Bates, 1884)

Species of beetle

Falsomesosella glacilior is a species of beetle in the family Cerambycidae. It was described by Henry Walter Bates in 1884.
