= Falsomesosella robusta =

Scientific classification
- Kingdom: Animalia
- Phylum: Arthropoda
- Class: Insecta
- Order: Coleoptera
- Suborder: Polyphaga
- Infraorder: Cucujiformia
- Family: Cerambycidae
- Genus: Falsomesosella
- Species: F. robusta

Binomial name
- Falsomesosella robusta Pic, 1944

Species of beetle

Falsomesosella robusta is a species of beetle in the family Cerambycidae. It was described by Maurice Pic in 1944.
