= Falsomesosella grisella =

Scientific classification
- Domain: Eukaryota
- Kingdom: Animalia
- Phylum: Arthropoda
- Class: Insecta
- Order: Coleoptera
- Suborder: Polyphaga
- Infraorder: Cucujiformia
- Family: Cerambycidae
- Genus: Falsomesosella
- Species: F. grisella

Binomial name
- Falsomesosella grisella (White, 1858)

Synonyms
- Cacia grisella White, 1858

Species of beetle

Falsomesosella grisella is a species of beetle in the family Cerambycidae. It was described by White in 1858. It is known from Taiwan.
