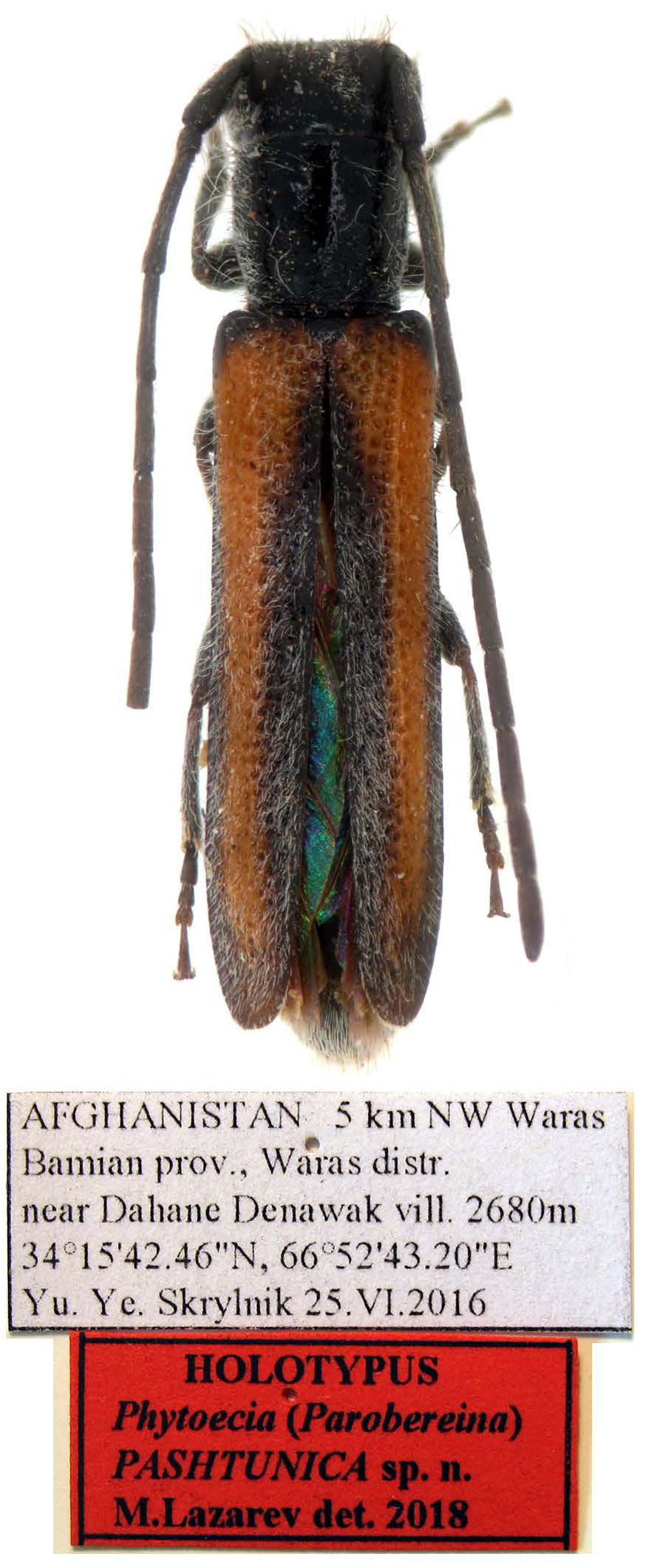
- Phytoecia (Parobereina) pashtunica Lazarev, 2019 (Holotype)

Scientific classification
- Kingdom: Animalia
- Phylum: Arthropoda
- Clade: Pancrustacea
- Class: Insecta
- Order: Coleoptera
- Suborder: Polyphaga
- Infraorder: Cucujiformia
- Family: Cerambycidae
- Genus: Phytoecia
- Species: P. pashtunica

Binomial name
- Phytoecia pashtunica Lazarev, 2019

= Phytoecia pashtunica =

Species of beetle

Phytoecia pashtunica is a species of longhorn beetle in the family Cerambycidae. It was described by Lazarev in 2019. It is known from Afghanistan.

== Name ==
Phytoecia (Parobereina) pashtunica Lazarev, 2019: 122

Type locality: Afghanistan, Bamian province, Waras district, 5 km SW Waras near Dahane Denawak village, 34°15′42.46″N 66°52′43.20″E, 2680 m.

Holotype: Coll. Danilevsky. female, each with 2 labels: 1) “AFGANISTAN 5 km WS Waras / Bamian prov., Waras distr. / near Dahane Denawak vill. 2680 m / 34°15′42.46″N 66°52′43.20″E / Yu.Ye. Skrylnik 25.VI.2016.”; 2) “HOLOTYPUS / Phytoecia (Parobereina) / PASHTUNICA sp.n. / M.Lazarev det. 2019”.

The species is named after the Pashtuns, the largest ethnic group in Afghanistan.
