= Erythrotes =

Scientific classification
- Kingdom: Animalia
- Phylum: Arthropoda
- Class: Insecta
- Order: Coleoptera
- Suborder: Polyphaga
- Infraorder: Cucujiformia
- Family: Cerambycidae
- Subfamily: Lamiinae
- Tribe: Lamiini
- Genus: Erythrotes; Lazarev, 2020
- Species: E. murzini

Binomial name
- Erythrotes murzini Lazarev, 2020

Genus of beetles

Erythrotes is a genus of beetles assigned to the family Cerambycidae, containing one species from China, Erythrotes murzini. It was described by Lazarev in 2020. It is endemic to the Sichuan Province in China. "Erythrotes" is derived from the Greek noun ερυθρότης (redness), referring to the red color of the body of the species.
