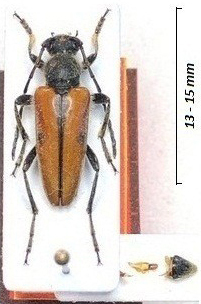
- Vadonia lazarevi Vartanis, 2026 (Holotype, male)

Scientific classification
- Kingdom: Animalia
- Phylum: Arthropoda
- Class: Insecta
- Order: Coleoptera
- Suborder: Polyphaga
- Infraorder: Cucujiformia
- Family: Cerambycidae
- Genus: Vadonia
- Species: V. lazarevi

Binomial name
- Vadonia lazarevi Vartanis, 2026

= Vadonia lazarevi =

Species of beetle

Vadonia lazarevi is a species of beetle in the family Cerambycidae. It was described by Vartanis 2026. It is known from Greece, Crete.

== Name ==
Vadonia lazarevi Vartanis, 2026: 32

Type locality: Greece, Crete Isl., Idi Mt., Fourfouras.

Holotype: Coll. Vartanis. male, Greece, Crete Isl., Idi Mt., Fourfouras, V.2024, Alexis Vartanis lgt.

Etymology: In honor of Maxim Alexandrovich Lazarev.
