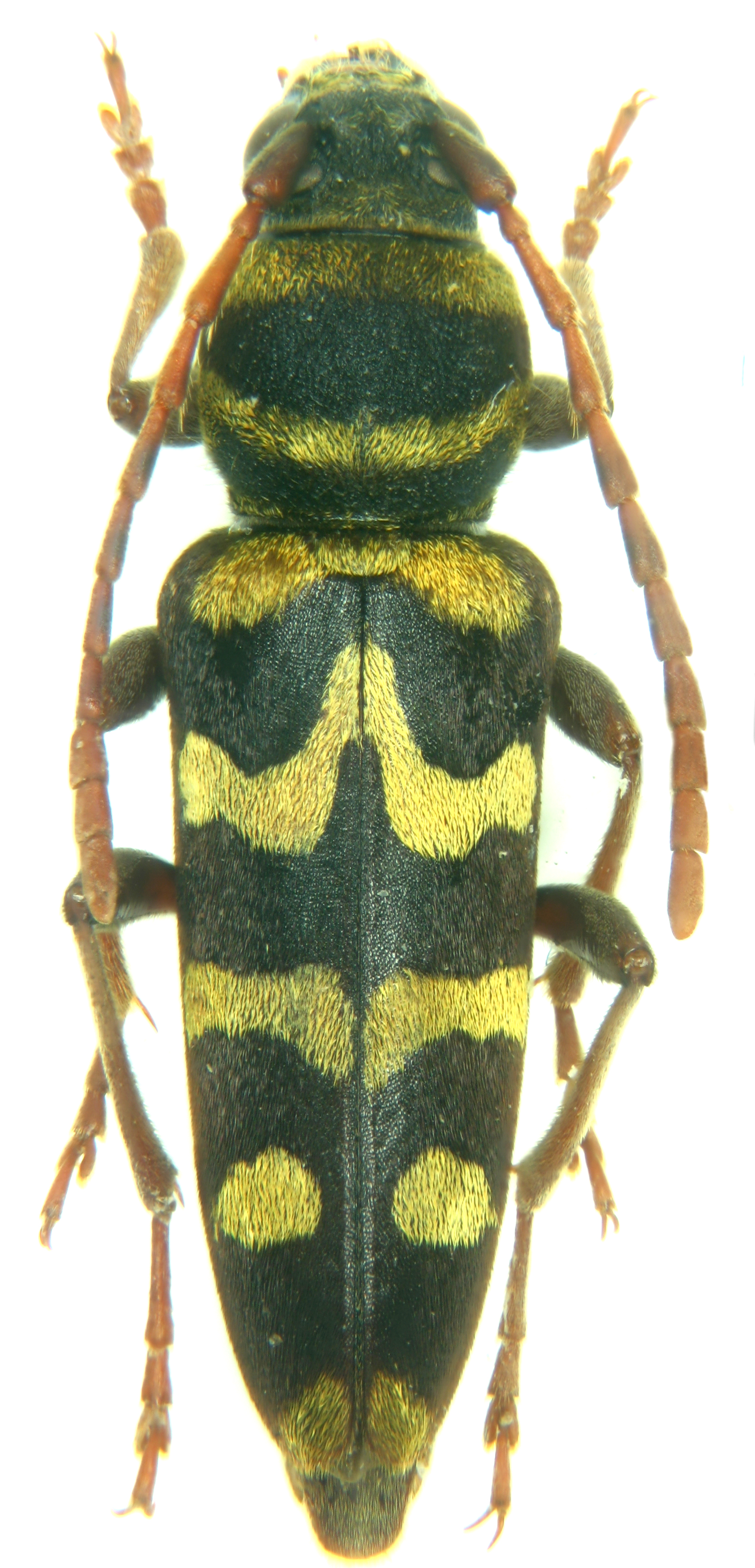
- Neoplagionotus bednariki Lazarev, 2022 (Holotype, ♀)

Scientific classification
- Kingdom: Animalia
- Phylum: Arthropoda
- Class: Insecta
- Order: Coleoptera
- Suborder: Polyphaga
- Infraorder: Cucujiformia
- Family: Cerambycidae
- Genus: Neoplagionotus
- Species: N. bednariki

Binomial name
- Neoplagionotus bednariki Lazarev, 2022

= Neoplagionotus bednariki =

Species of beetle

Neoplagionotus bednariki is a species of beetle in the family Cerambycidae. It was described by Lazarev in 2022. It is known from Turkey.

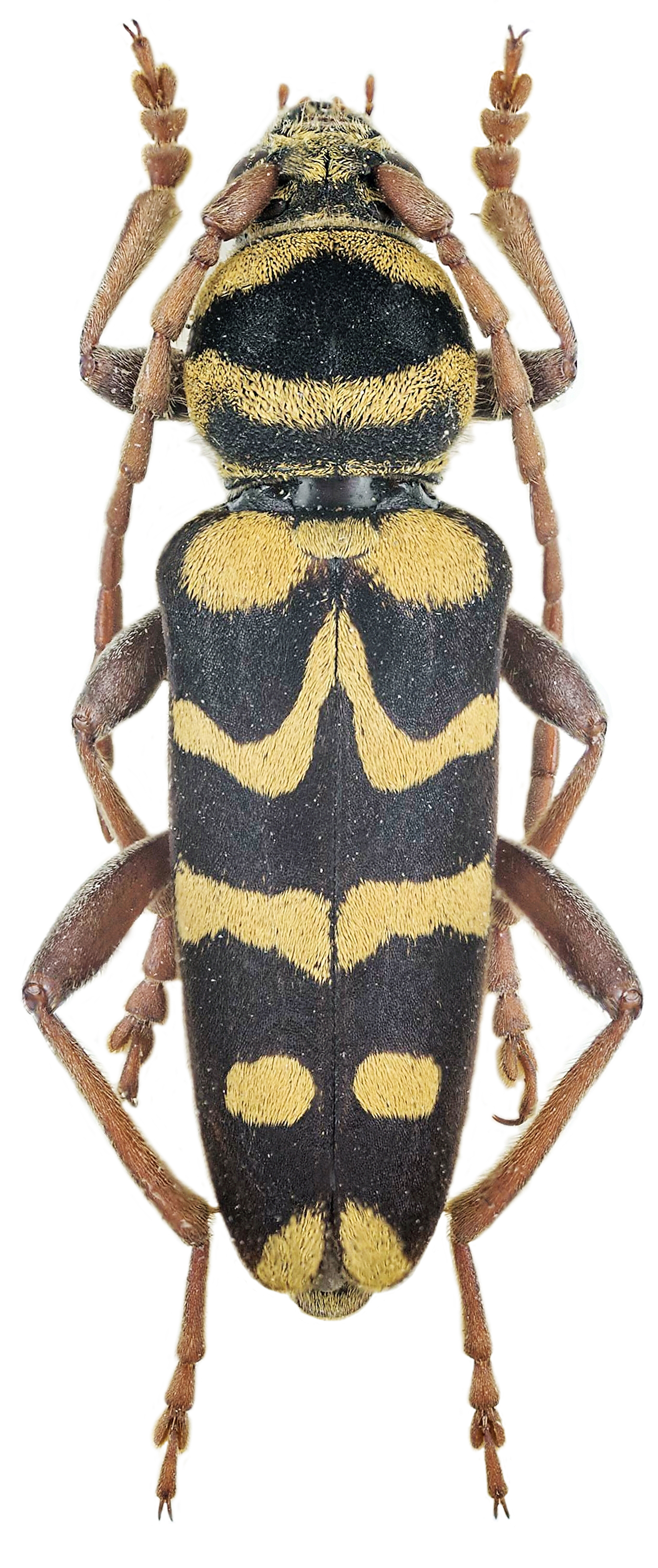
Neoplagionotus bednariki Lazarev, 2022 (Paratype, ♂)

== Name ==
The binomial name is Neoplagionotus bednariki Lazarev, 2022 the Type locality is Turkey, İzmir, Bergama, Pergamon hills, and the Holotype is Coll. Lazarev. female, Turkey, İzmir, Bergama, Pergamon hills., 02.VI.1991, legit Bednařík & Kovařík.
