= Falsomesosella subalba =

Scientific classification
- Domain: Eukaryota
- Kingdom: Animalia
- Phylum: Arthropoda
- Class: Insecta
- Order: Coleoptera
- Suborder: Polyphaga
- Infraorder: Cucujiformia
- Family: Cerambycidae
- Genus: Falsomesosella
- Species: F. subalba

Binomial name
- Falsomesosella subalba Gressitt, 1938

Species of beetle

Falsomesosella subalba is a species of beetle in the family Cerambycidae. It was described by Gressitt in 1938.
