= Dorcadion megriense =

Scientific classification
- Kingdom: Animalia
- Phylum: Arthropoda
- Clade: Pancrustacea
- Class: Insecta
- Order: Coleoptera
- Suborder: Polyphaga
- Infraorder: Cucujiformia
- Family: Cerambycidae
- Genus: Dorcadion
- Species: D. megriense

Binomial name
- Dorcadion megriense Lazarev, 2009

Species of beetle

Dorcadion megriense is a species of beetle in the family Cerambycidae. It was described by Lazarev in 2009. It is known from Armenia.

== Name ==
Dorcadion sisianense Lazarev, 2009: 210

Type locality: Armenia, Megri ridge, 5–6 km N Shvanidzor, 39°40′N 45°45′E, 1500 m.

Holotype: Coll. Danilevsky. male, Armenia, Megri ridge, 5–6 km N Shvanidzor, 39°40′N 45°45′E, 1500 m, V.2003, Malkhasanian leg.

== int:Links ==
- Tavakilian, G. & Chevillotte, H.: TITAN: Cerambycidae database.
- Danilevsky, M. & Lazarev, M.: http://cerambycidae.net/.
- Zenodo PDF
- Media related to Dorcadion megriense at Wikimedia Commons
- Data related to Dorcadion megriense at Wikispecies
