= Dorcadion ciscaucasicum mokrzeckii =

Scientific classification
- Kingdom: Animalia
- Phylum: Arthropoda
- Clade: Pancrustacea
- Class: Insecta
- Order: Coleoptera
- Suborder: Polyphaga
- Infraorder: Cucujiformia
- Family: Cerambycidae
- Genus: Dorcadion
- Species: D. ciscaucasicum
- Subspecies: D. c. mokrzeckii

Trinomial name
- Dorcadion ciscaucasicum mokrzeckii Jakovlev, 1902

Synonyms
- Dorcadion mokrzeckii pliginskii Plavilstshikov, 1958; Dorcadion (Autodorcadion) mokrzeckii Jakovlev, 1902; Dorcadion (Cribridorcadion) mokrzeckii Jakovlev, 1902; Dorcadion (Pedestredorcadion) mokrzeckii Jakovlev, 1902; Dorcadion mokrzeckii Jakovlev, 1902

Species of beetle

Dorcadion ciscaucasicum mokrzeckii is a subspecies of longhorn beetle in the subfamily Lamiinae which is endemic to Ukraine. This beetle's taxonomy has been in flux and it is currently considered to be a subspecies of Dorcadion ciscaucasicum.

== Description ==
The length of the adults is 10–12 millimetres (0.39–0.47 in). The prothorax has the setae lifted around the midline. The outer dorsal has shoulder stripes.
