= Jordanoleiopus annae =

Scientific classification
- Kingdom: Animalia
- Phylum: Arthropoda
- Class: Insecta
- Order: Coleoptera
- Suborder: Polyphaga
- Infraorder: Cucujiformia
- Family: Cerambycidae
- Genus: Jordanoleiopus
- Species: J. annae

Binomial name
- Jordanoleiopus annae Lazarev & Skrylnyk, 2023

Species of beetle

Jordanoleiopus annae is a species of beetle in the family Cerambycidae. It was described by Maxim Lazarev and Yuriy Skrylnyk in 2023. It is known from Oman.

Males measure 3.8–4.5 mm (0.15–0.18 in) and females 3.9–5.1 mm (0.15–0.20 in) in length. It is polyphagous, feeding on broadleaf trees and shrubs (Croton sp., Jatropha dhofarica).

== Taxonomy ==
Jordanoleiopus annae Lazarev & Skrylnyk, 2023: 138

Type locality: S Oman, Dhofar Governorate, 5.5 km N Rakhyut village, near Ashqul village, 16°47′45.07″N 53°25′55.17″E, 833 m.

Holotype: Coll. Lazarev. male, S Oman, Dhofar Governorate, 5.5 km N Rakhyut vill., near Ashqul vill., 16°47′45.07″N 53°25′55.17″E, 833 m, 26.8.2019, Yu. Skrylnyk leg.
