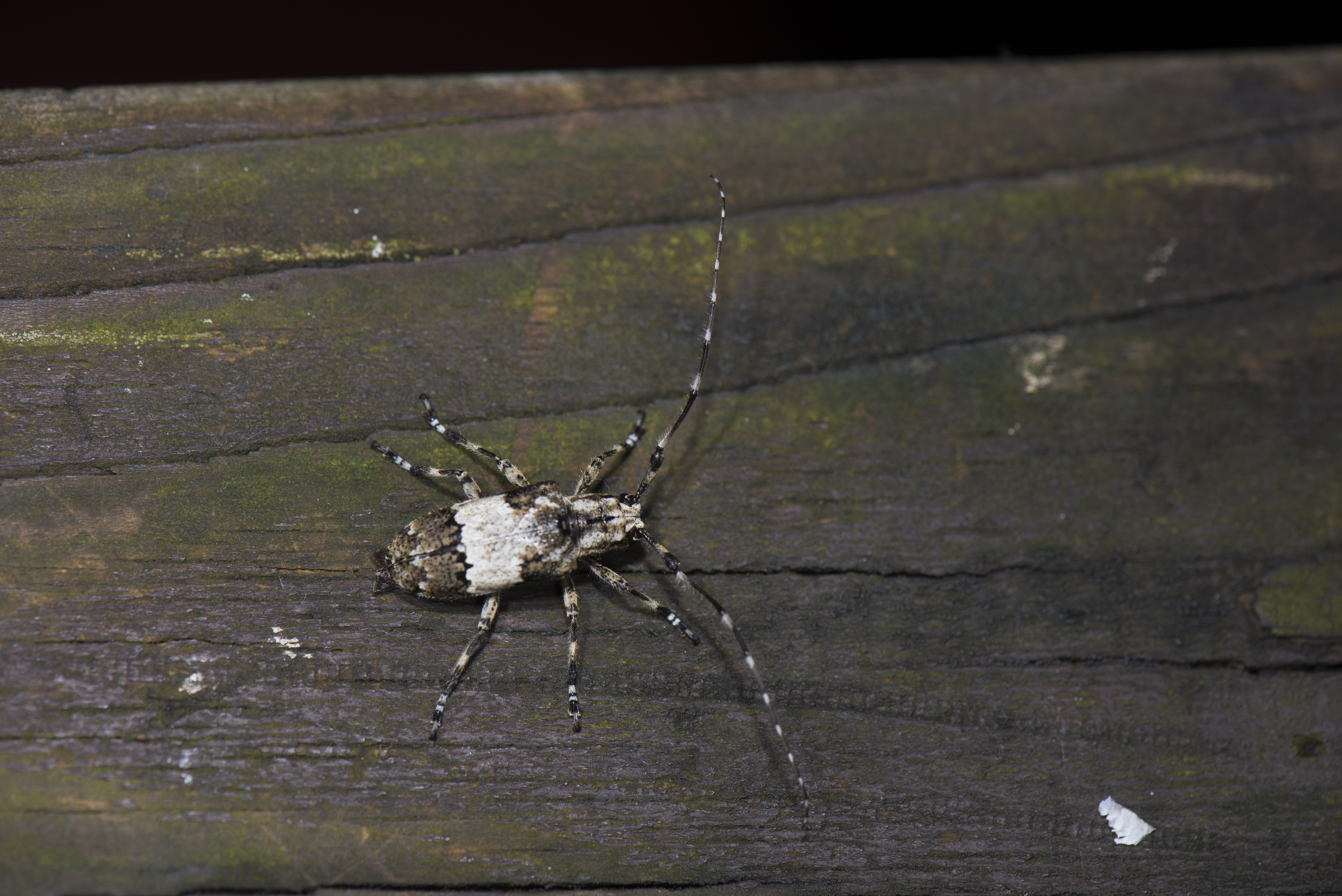

Scientific classification
- Domain: Eukaryota
- Kingdom: Animalia
- Phylum: Arthropoda
- Class: Insecta
- Order: Coleoptera
- Suborder: Polyphaga
- Infraorder: Cucujiformia
- Family: Cerambycidae
- Tribe: Mesosini
- Genus: Falsomesosella

= Falsomesosella =

Genus of beetles

Falsomesosella is a genus of longhorn beetles of the subfamily Lamiinae, containing the following species:

subgenus Falsomesosella

- Falsomesosella affinis Breuning, 1938
- Falsomesosella albofasciata Pic, 1925
- Falsomesosella andamanica Breuning, 1936
- Falsomesosella annamensis Breuning, 1939
- Falsomesosella basigranulata Breuning, 1968
- Falsomesosella bifasciata Breuning, 1938
- Falsomesosella breuningi Pic, 1944
- Falsomesosella ceylonica Breuning, 1974
- Falsomesosella densepunctata Breuning, 1968
- Falsomesosella elongata Breuning, 1938
- Falsomesosella gardneri Breuning, 1938
- Falsomesosella glacilior (Bates, 1884)
- Falsomesosella grisella (White, 1858)
- Falsomesosella grisescens Breuning, 1939
- Falsomesosella horishana Gressitt, 1938
- Falsomesosella javanica Breuning, 1956
- Falsomesosella mediofasciata Breuning, 1968
- Falsomesosella minor Pic, 1925
- Falsomesosella nigronotata Pic, 1930
- Falsomesosella nilghirica Breuning, 1936
- Falsomesosella obliquevittata Breuning, 1938
- Falsomesosella ochreomarmorata Breuning, 1968
- Falsomesosella parvula Breuning, 1938
- Falsomesosella robusta Pic, 1944
- Falsomesosella rufovittata Breuning, 1938
- Falsomesosella subalba Gressitt, 1938
- Falsomesosella subunicolor Breuning, 1969
- Falsomesosella taibaishana Lazarev, 2021
- Falsomesosella theresae Pic, 1945
- Falsomesosella transversefasciata Breuning, 1938
- Falsomesosella truncatipennis Pic, 1944
- Falsomesosella unicolor Breuning, 1969

subgenus Pseudomesosella

- Falsomesosella saigonensis Breuning, 1938
