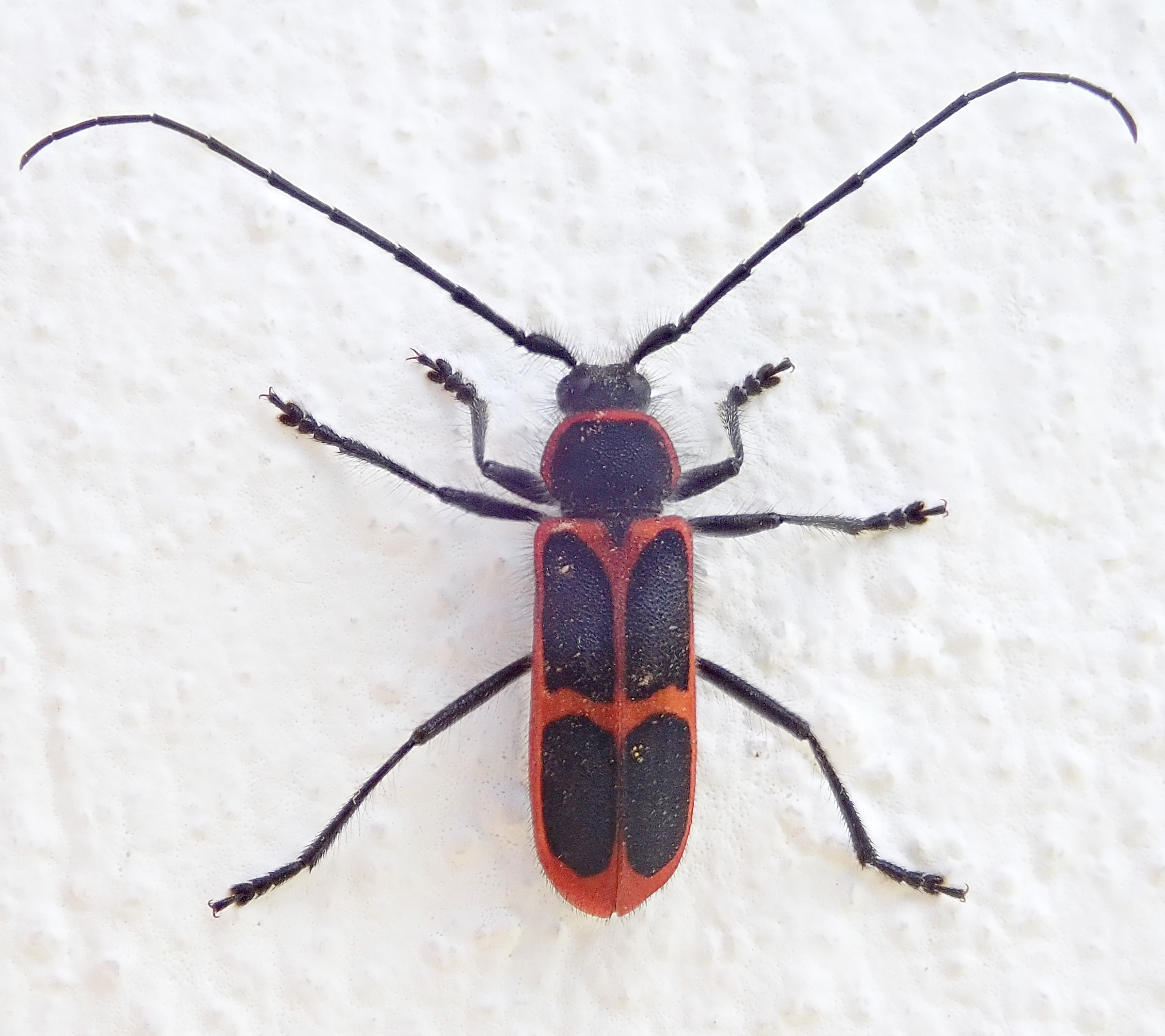
- Calchaenesthes oblongomaculata

Scientific classification
- Domain: Eukaryota
- Kingdom: Animalia
- Phylum: Arthropoda
- Class: Insecta
- Order: Coleoptera
- Suborder: Polyphaga
- Infraorder: Cucujiformia
- Family: Cerambycidae
- Subfamily: Cerambycinae
- Tribe: Trachyderini
- Genus: Calchaenesthes; Kraatz, 1863

Type species
- Callidium oblongomaculatum Guérin-Méneville, 1844

species
- 6 species in the genus

Synonyms
- Hysginois Kraatz, 1863: 98 (type species: Hysginois quadrigeminus truqui, monotypy)

= Calchaenesthes =

Genus of beetles

Calchaenesthes is a genus of beetles in the family Cerambycidae, containing the following species:

- Calchaenesthes ambrusi Lazarev, 2023
- Calchaenesthes diversicollis Holzschuh, 1977
- Calchaenesthes oblongomaculata (Guérin-Méneville, 1844)
- Calchaenesthes pistacivora Holzschuh, 2003
- Calchaenesthes primis Özdikmen, 2013
- Calchaenesthes sexmaculata (Reiche, 1861)
