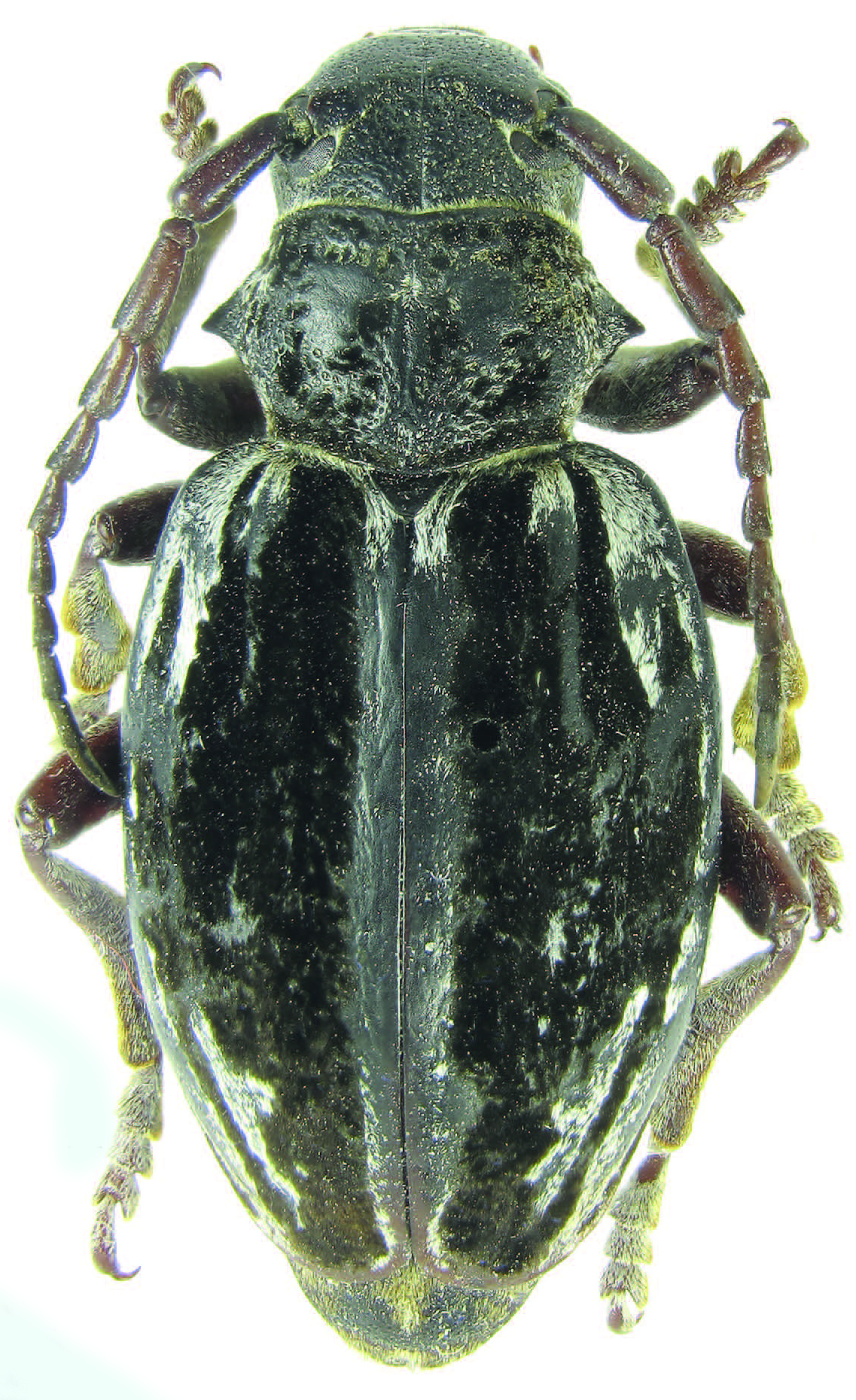
- Female, holotype

Scientific classification
- Kingdom: Animalia
- Phylum: Arthropoda
- Clade: Pancrustacea
- Class: Insecta
- Order: Coleoptera
- Suborder: Polyphaga
- Infraorder: Cucujiformia
- Family: Cerambycidae
- Genus: Dorcadion
- Species: D. mirabile

Binomial name
- Dorcadion mirabile Lazarev, 2024

Synonyms
- Dorcadion (Carinatodorcadion) mirabile Lazarev, 2024: 152 (misspelling)

= Dorcadion mirabile =

Species of beetle

Dorcadion mirabile is a species of beetle in the family Cerambycidae. It was described by Lazarev in 2024. It is known from Turkey.

== Name ==
Dorcadion (Cribridorcadion) mirabile Lazarev 2024: 152 (corrigendum)

Type locality: North-east Turkey, Erzurum, Askale, 39°55′N 40°41′E.

Holotype: Coll. Lazarev. Holotype, female, Turkey, Erzurum, Askale, 39°55′N 40°41′E, 6.6.2002, V.I. Dorofeev leg.

Etymology: The Latin species name “mirabile” in English is “wonderful”.

== Links ==
- Tavakilian, G. & Chevillotte, H.: TITAN: Cerambycidae database.
- Danilevsky, M. & Lazarev, M.: http://cerambycidae.net/.
- Media related to Dorcadion mirabile at Wikimedia Commons
- Data related to Dorcadion mirabile at Wikispecies
