= Calchaenesthes ambrusi =

Scientific classification
- Kingdom: Animalia
- Phylum: Arthropoda
- Class: Insecta
- Order: Coleoptera
- Suborder: Polyphaga
- Infraorder: Cucujiformia
- Family: Cerambycidae
- Genus: Calchaenesthes
- Species: C. ambrusi

Binomial name
- Calchaenesthes ambrusi Lazarev, 2023

Species of beetle

Calchaenesthes ambrusi is a species of beetle in the family Cerambycidae. It was described by Lazarev in 2023. It is known from Cyprus. This species is named after Richard Ambrus, a Czech entomologist.
