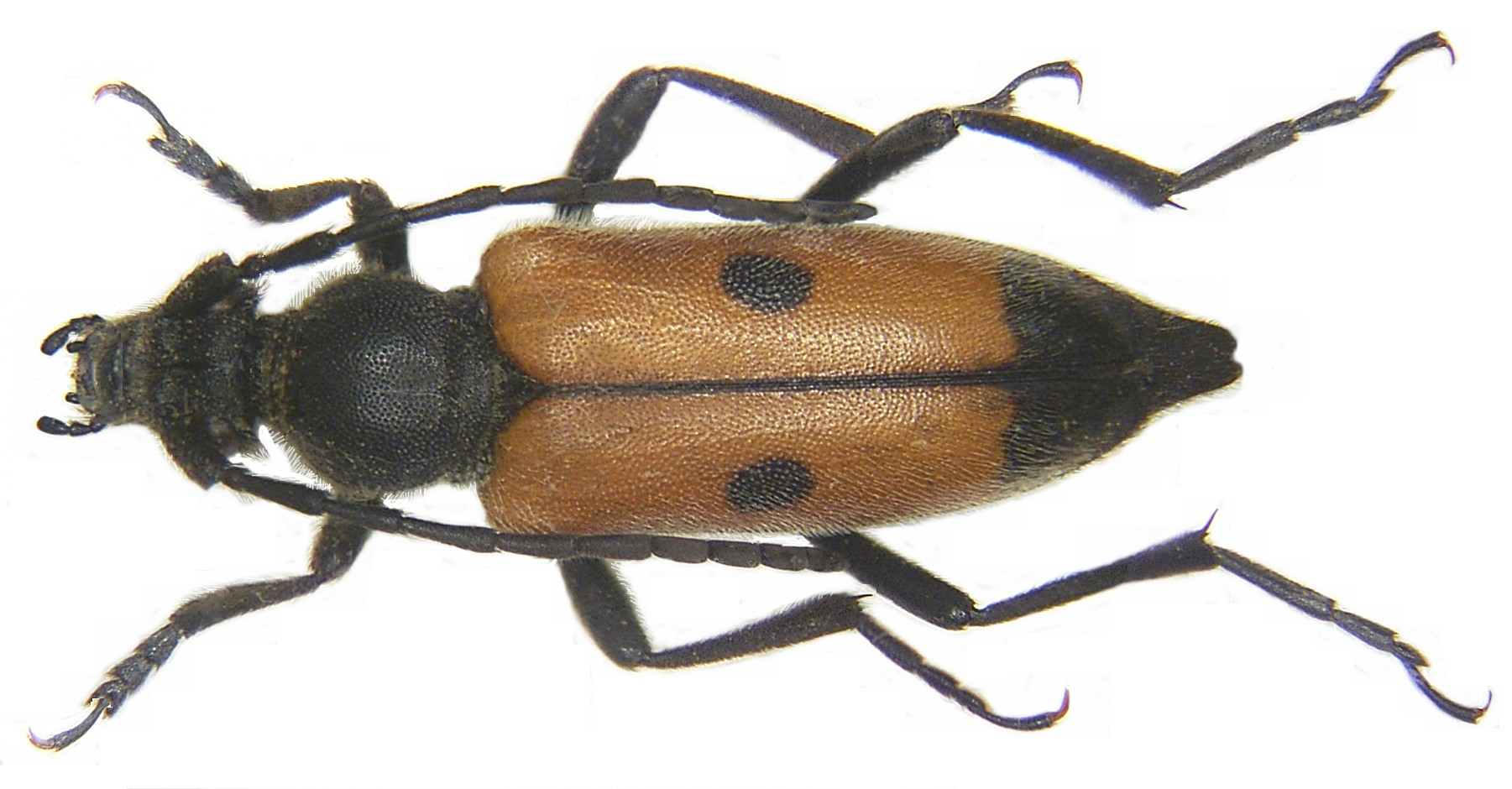
- Vadonia bisignata

Scientific classification
- Kingdom: Animalia
- Phylum: Arthropoda
- Class: Insecta
- Order: Coleoptera
- Suborder: Polyphaga
- Infraorder: Cucujiformia
- Family: Cerambycidae
- Genus: Vadonia; Mulsant, 1863

= Vadonia =

Genus of beetle

Vadonia is a species of beetle in the family Cerambycidae.

== Species ==
The following species are recognised in the genus Vadonia:

- Vadonia bicolor (Redtenbacher, 1850)
- Vadonia bipunctata (Fabricius, 1781)
- Vadonia bittisiensis Chevrolat, 1882
- Vadonia bolognai Sama, 1982
- Vadonia ciliciensis (K.Daniel & J.Daniel, 1891)
- Vadonia danielorum Holzschuh, 1984
- Vadonia dojranensis Holzschuh, 1984
- Vadonia frater Holzschuh, 1981
- Vadonia grandicollis Mulsant & Rey, 1863
- Vadonia gusmii Pesarini & Sabbadini, 2009
- Vadonia hirsuta (K.Daniel & J.Daniel, 1891)
- Vadonia imitatrix (K.Daniel & J.Daniel, 1891)
- Vadonia insidiosa Holzschuh, 1984
- Vadonia ispirensis Holzschuh, 1993
- Vadonia instigmata Pic, 1889
- Vadonia lazarevi Vartanis, 2026
- Vadonia mainoldii Pesarini & Sabbadini, 2004
- Vadonia moesiaca (K.Daniel & J.Daniel, 1891)
- Vadonia monostigma Ganglbauer, 1882
- Vadonia parnassensis (Pic, 1925)
- Vadonia soror Holzschuh, 1981
- Vadonia unipunctata (Fabricius, 1787)
- Vadonia vartanisi Danilevsky, 2014]
