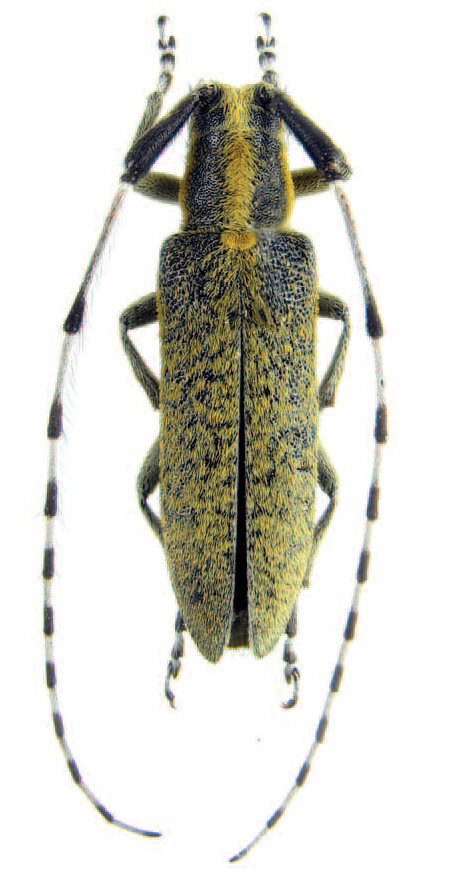
- Agapanthia danilevskyi Lazarev, 2013 (Holotype, male)

Scientific classification
- Kingdom: Animalia
- Phylum: Arthropoda
- Clade: Pancrustacea
- Class: Insecta
- Order: Coleoptera
- Suborder: Polyphaga
- Infraorder: Cucujiformia
- Family: Cerambycidae
- Genus: Agapanthia
- Species: A. danilevskyi

Binomial name
- Agapanthia danilevskyi Lazarev, 2013

= Agapanthia danilevskyi =

Species of beetle

Agapanthia danilevskyi is a species of beetle in the family Cerambycidae. It was described by Lazarev in 2013. It is known from Kazakhstan.

== Name ==
Agapanthia (Epoptes) danilevskyi Lazarev, 2013: 235

Type locality: South Kazakhstan, left bank of Syrdarya River, about 41°16′N 67°54′E, 260 m.

Holotype: Coll. Danilevsky. male, South Kazakhstan, left bank of Syrdarya River opposite Chardara, about 41°16′N 67°54′E, 260 m, 22.4.1980, G.Nikolaev leg.

Etymology: In honor of Mikhail Leontievich Danilevsky.
