= Falsomesosella minor =

Scientific classification
- Kingdom: Animalia
- Phylum: Arthropoda
- Class: Insecta
- Order: Coleoptera
- Suborder: Polyphaga
- Infraorder: Cucujiformia
- Family: Cerambycidae
- Genus: Falsomesosella
- Species: F. minor

Binomial name
- Falsomesosella minor Pic, 1925

Species of beetle

Falsomesosella minor is a species of beetle in the family Cerambycidae. It was described by Maurice Pic in 1925.
