= Neoplagionotus =

Scientific classification
- Domain: Eukaryota
- Kingdom: Animalia
- Phylum: Arthropoda
- Class: Insecta
- Order: Coleoptera
- Suborder: Polyphaga
- Infraorder: Cucujiformia
- Family: Cerambycidae
- Subfamily: Cerambycinae
- Tribe: Clytini
- Genus: Neoplagionotus; Kasatkin, 2005

Genus of beetles

Neoplagionotus is a genus of beetle in the family Cerambycidae. It was described by Kasatkin in 2005. Type species: Clytus bobelayei Brullé, 1832

== Species ==
- Neoplagionotus andreui (Fuente, 1908)
- Neoplagionotus bednariki Lazarev, 2022
- Neoplagionotus bobelayei (Brullé, 1832)
  - Neoplagionotus bobelayei huseyini Lazarev, 2016
  - Neoplagionotus bobelayei mouzafferi (Pic, 1905)
- Neoplagionotus karmelicola Lazarev, 2022
- Neoplagionotus scalaris (Brullé, 1832)
