= Falsomesosella nigronotata =

Scientific classification
- Kingdom: Animalia
- Phylum: Arthropoda
- Class: Insecta
- Order: Coleoptera
- Suborder: Polyphaga
- Infraorder: Cucujiformia
- Family: Cerambycidae
- Genus: Falsomesosella
- Species: F. nigronotata

Binomial name
- Falsomesosella nigronotata Pic, 1930

Species of beetle

Falsomesosella nigronotata is a species of beetle in the family Cerambycidae. It was described by Maurice Pic in 1930.

== Subspecies ==
- Falsomesosella nigronotata hakka Gressitt, 1937
- Falsomesosella nigronotata nigronotata Pic, 1930
