= Dorcadion ciscaucasicum =

Scientific classification
- Kingdom: Animalia
- Phylum: Arthropoda
- Clade: Pancrustacea
- Class: Insecta
- Order: Coleoptera
- Suborder: Polyphaga
- Infraorder: Cucujiformia
- Family: Cerambycidae
- Genus: Dorcadion
- Species: D. ciscaucasicum

Binomial name
- Dorcadion ciscaucasicum Jakovlev, 1899

Synonyms
- Dorcadion borodini Suvorov, 1915: 118 - «Ставропольская губ.: станица Прасковея» [2 км юго-восточнее Будённовска] (in Russian)

Species of beetle

Dorcadion ciscaucasicum is a species of longhorn beetle in the subfamily Lamiinae.

== Subspecies ==
- Dorcadion ciscaucasicum ciscaucasicum Jakovlev, 1899
- Dorcadion ciscaucasicum mokrzeckii Jakovlev, 1902
- Dorcadion ciscaucasicum abramovi Lazarev, 2009

== Description ==
The length of the adults is 10–12 millimetres (0.39–0.47 in). The prothorax is without raised bristles. The outer dorsal stripe is nearly twice the suture, which is slightly narrower than the shoulder.

== Distribution ==
The species is found in Russia and the Caucasus, and is also known to inhabit the steppes.
