= Falsomesosella basigranulata =

Scientific classification
- Kingdom: Animalia
- Phylum: Arthropoda
- Class: Insecta
- Order: Coleoptera
- Suborder: Polyphaga
- Infraorder: Cucujiformia
- Family: Cerambycidae
- Genus: Falsomesosella
- Species: F. basigranulata

Binomial name
- Falsomesosella basigranulata Breuning, 1968

Species of beetle

Falsomesosella basigranulata is a species of beetle in the family Cerambycidae. It was described by Stephan von Breuning in 1968.
