= Dorcadion mniszechi =

Scientific classification
- Kingdom: Animalia
- Phylum: Arthropoda
- Clade: Pancrustacea
- Class: Insecta
- Order: Coleoptera
- Suborder: Polyphaga
- Infraorder: Cucujiformia
- Family: Cerambycidae
- Genus: Dorcadion
- Species: D. mniszechi

Binomial name
- Dorcadion mniszechi Kraatz, 1873

Synonyms
- Dorcadion (Cribridorcadion) Mniszechi m. rugulosum Breuning, 1946

Species of beetle

Dorcadion (Cribridorcadion) mniszechi is a species of beetle in the family Cerambycidae. It was described by Kraatz in 1873. It is known from Armenia and Turkey.

== Subspecies ==
- Dorcadion mniszechi cavernosum Lazarev, 2014
- Dorcadion mniszechi georgianum Lazarev, 2014
