= Falsomesosella theresae =

Scientific classification
- Kingdom: Animalia
- Phylum: Arthropoda
- Class: Insecta
- Order: Coleoptera
- Suborder: Polyphaga
- Infraorder: Cucujiformia
- Family: Cerambycidae
- Genus: Falsomesosella
- Species: F. theresae

Binomial name
- Falsomesosella theresae Pic, 1945

Species of beetle

Falsomesosella theresae is a species of beetle in the family Cerambycidae. It was described by Maurice Pic in 1945.
