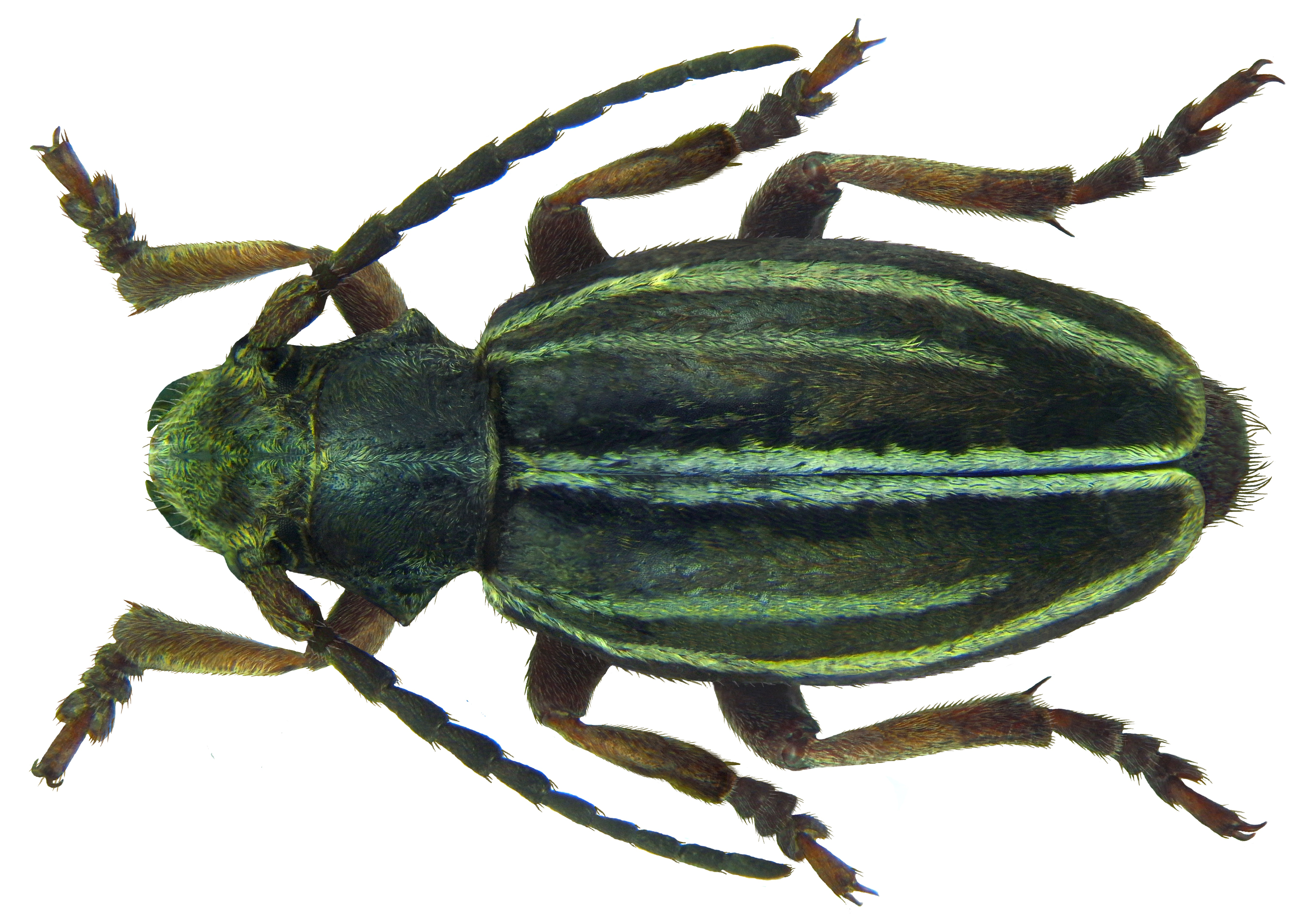

Scientific classification
- Kingdom: Animalia
- Phylum: Arthropoda
- Clade: Pancrustacea
- Class: Insecta
- Order: Coleoptera
- Suborder: Polyphaga
- Infraorder: Cucujiformia
- Family: Cerambycidae
- Genus: Dorcadion
- Species: D. cinerarium

Binomial name
- Dorcadion cinerarium (Fabricius, 1787)

Synonyms
- Cerambyx cinerarius (Fabricius, 1787); Lamia cineraria Fabricius, 1787; Lamia tricolor Fischer von Waldheim, 1805; Pedestredorcadion cinerarium (Fabricius, 1787); Dorcadion caucasicum (Küster) (partim.); Dorcadion sericatum (Sahlberg) (partim.)

= Dorcadion cinerarium =

Species of beetle

Dorcadion cinerarium is a species of beetle in the family Cerambycidae. It was described by Johan Christian Fabricius in 1787, originally under the genus Lamia. It is known from Ukraine, Azerbaijan, and Russia.

== Subspecies ==
- Dorcadion cinerarium adygorum Lazarev, 2011
- Dorcadion cinerarium azovense Lazarev, 2011
- Dorcadion cinerarium bartenevi Lazarev, 2011
- Dorcadion cinerarium belousovi Lazarev, 2011
- Dorcadion cinerarium cinerarium (Fabricius, 1787)
- Dorcadion cinerarium deniz Lazarev, 2011
- Dorcadion cinerarium gorodinskii Danilevsky, 1996
- Dorcadion cinerarium macropoides Plavilstshikov, 1932
- Dorcadion cinerarium mosyakini Danilevsky, 2021
- Dorcadion cinerarium napolovi Lazarev, 2011
- Dorcadion cinerarium novorossicum Lazarev, 2015
- Dorcadion cinerarium panticapaeum Plavilstshikov, 1951
- Dorcadion cinerarium papayense Lazarev, 2014
- Dorcadion cinerarium perroudi Pic, 1942
- Dorcadion cinerarium sindorum Lazarev, 2011
- Dorcadion cinerarium skrylniki Lazarev, 2011
- Dorcadion cinerarium smetanai Lazarev, 2011
- Dorcadion cinerarium terkense Lazarev, 2011
- Dorcadion cinerarium okhrimenkoi Danilevsky, 2016
- Dorcadion cinerarium veniamini Lazarev, 2011
- Dorcadion cinerarium zubovi Lazarev, 2011
