= Gyarancita =

Scientific classification
- Kingdom: Animalia
- Phylum: Arthropoda
- Class: Insecta
- Order: Coleoptera
- Suborder: Polyphaga
- Infraorder: Cucujiformia
- Family: Cerambycidae
- Genus: Gyarancita
- Species: G. rondoni

Binomial name
- Gyarancita rondoni Breuning, 1963

Species of beetle

Gyarancita rondoni is a species of beetle in the family Cerambycidae, and the only species in the genus Gyarancita. It was described by Breuning in 1963.
