= Maxim Lazarev =

Russian entomologist (born 1985)

Maxim Alexandrovich Lazarev
- Максим Александрович Лазарев
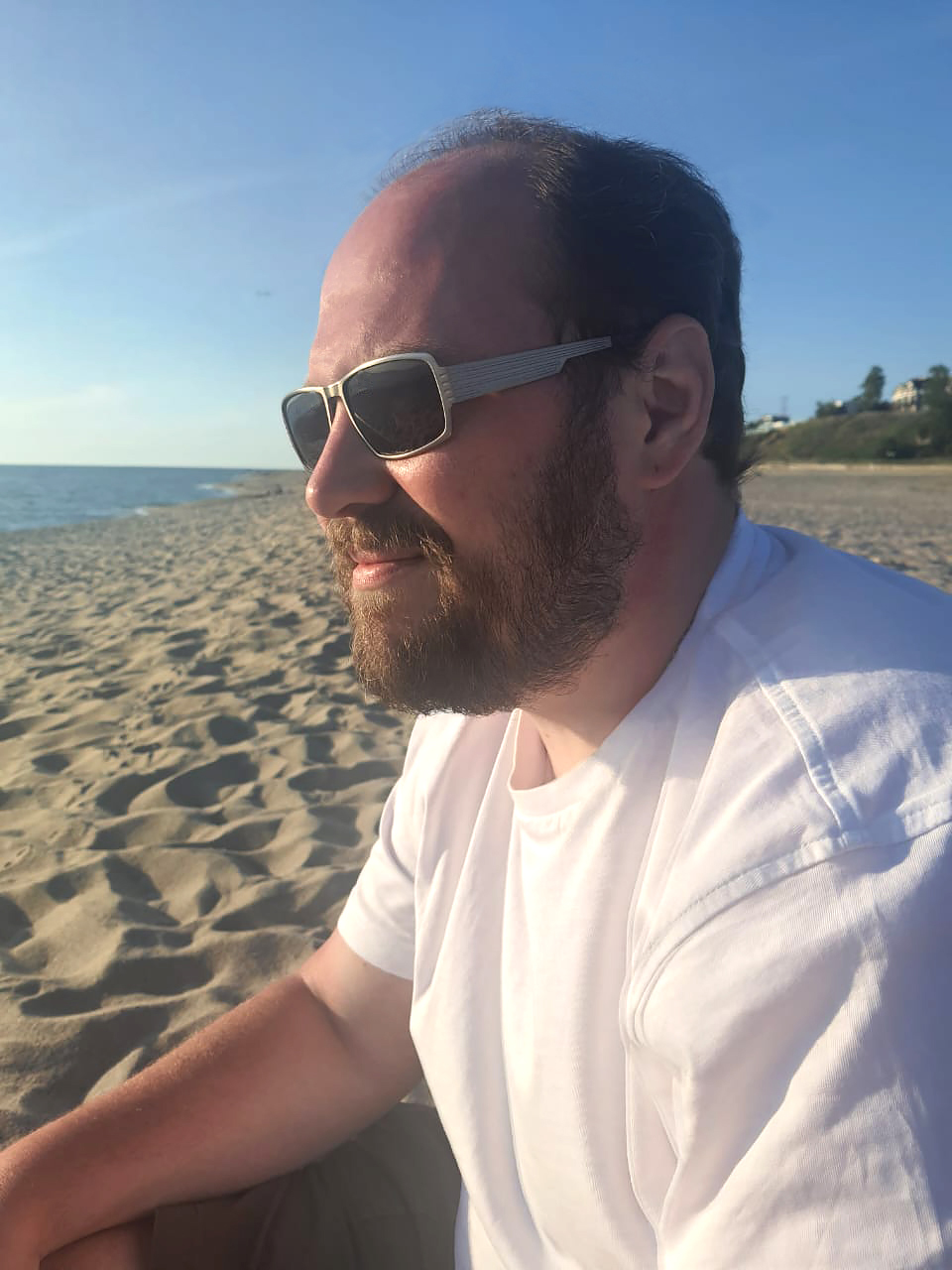
- Maxim Lazarev (2023)
- Born: June 28, 1985 (age 41); Volgograd, Russia
- Citizenship: Soviet Union, then Russian Federation
- Education: Moscow State Pedagogical University (master's degree, 2010), Institute of Art Education of the Russian Academy of Education (PhD, 2013)
- Known for: Research on Coleoptera (Cerambycidae)
- Scientific career
- Fields: Entomology, Education
- Workplaces: Free Economic Society of Russia
- Author abbrev. (zoology): Lazarev

Maxim Alexandrovich Lazarev (Максим Александрович Лазарев; born 28 June 1985) is a Russian entomologist specializing in the study of Coleoptera (particularly Cerambycidae). He is active in education and scientific research, and holds the degree of Candidate of Pedagogical Sciences (2013). He has been a Professor at the Russian Academy of Natural History since 2021. Lazarev is a member of the Entomological Section of the Moscow Society of Naturalists (since 2005) and has served as editor-in-chief of the journal Humanity space: International almanac since 2012.

== Works ==
- Lazarev, M.A. 2020. A revision of subspecies structure of Dorcadion (Cribridorcadion) scabricolle (Dalman, 1817) (Coleoptera, Cerambycidae). Moscow: International Academy of Education. 100 pp. ISBN 978-5-6042494-0-6. doi:10.5281/zenodo.6490110 Wikisource
- Lazarev, M.A. 2019. A revision of subspecies structure of Dorcadion (Cribridorcadion) nobile Hampe, 1852 (Coleoptera, Cerambycidae) with description of two new subspecies. Moscow: IAE. 28 p. ISBN 978-5-6040553-6-6 doi:10.5281/zenodo.6483237
- Lazarev, M.A. 2016. The art culture’s formation in modern teacher’s professional development. Monograph. Moscow: IAE; Daugavpils: DU. 180 pp. ISBN 978-5-9907401-3-6 doi:10.5281/zenodo.6520227

The author has published in the following magazines: Zootaxa, Annales Zoologici Fennici, Special Bulletin of the Japanese Society of Coleopterology, Entomological Review, Humanity space. International almanac, Lambillionea, Munis Entomology & Zoology, Pedagogical Scientific Journal, Scientific works of the Free Economic Society of Russia, Pedagogical Review, etc.

== Taxa described (selection) ==
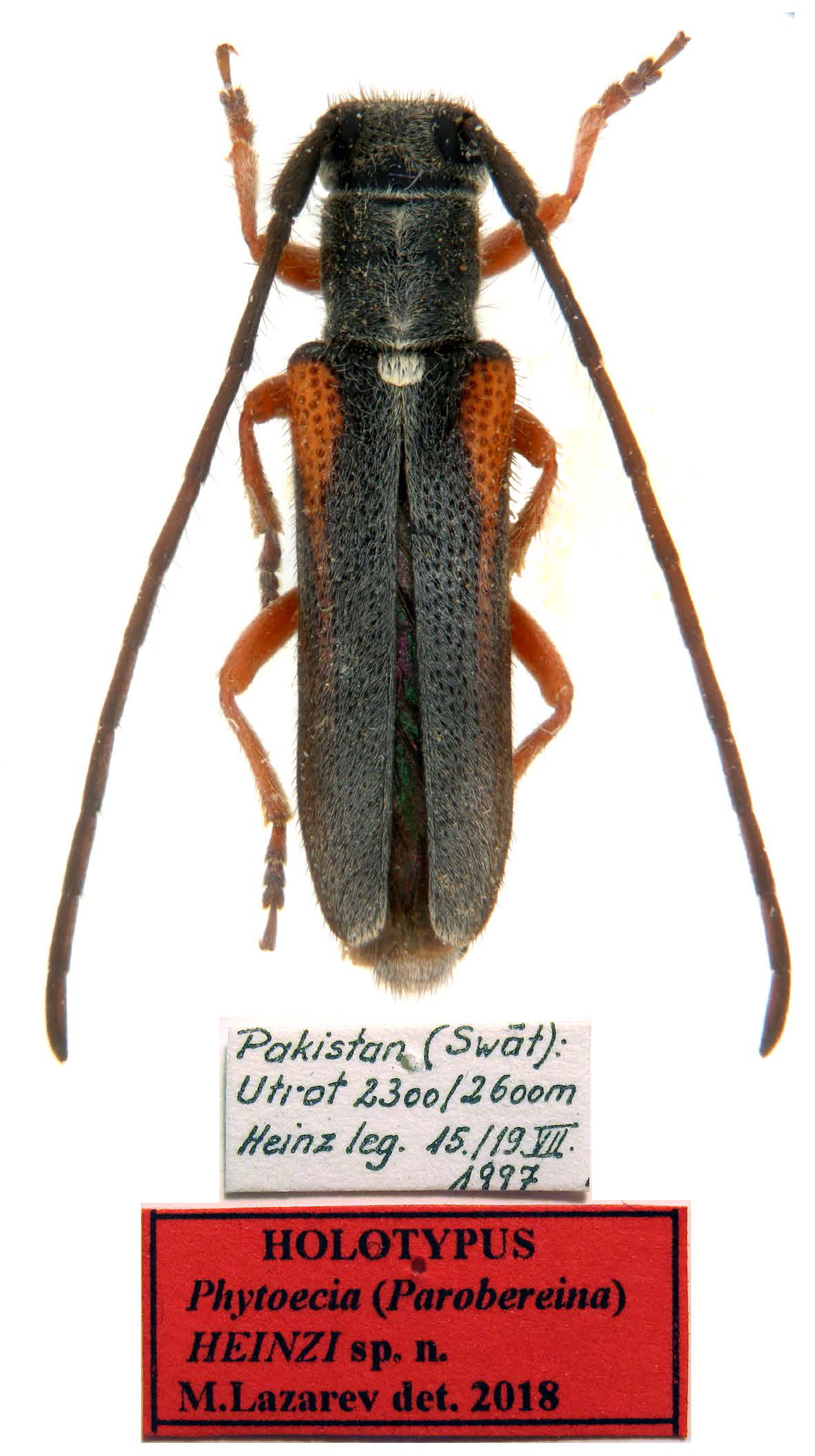
Phytoecia (Parobereina) heinzi Lazarev, 2019 (Holotype)

- Dorcadion mirabile Lazarev, 2024 (Cerambycidae).
- Paratetrops Lazarev, 2024 (Cerambycidae)
- Calchaenesthes ambrusi Lazarev, 2023 (Cerambycidae)
- Jordanoleiopus annae Lazarev & Skrylnyk, 2023 (Cerambycidae)
- Neoplagionotus bednariki Lazarev, 2022 (Cerambycidae)
- Olenecamptus parabilobus Lazarev & Murzin, 2021 (Cerambycidae)
- Erythrotes Lazarev, 2020 — type species: Erythrotes murzini Lazarev, 2020 (Cerambycidae)
- Neocerambyx elenae Lazarev, 2019 (Cerambycidae)
- Phytoecia heinzi Lazarev, 2019, (Cerambycidae)
- Phytoecia pashtunica Lazarev, 2019, (Cerambycidae)
- Cleroclytus semirufus savitskyi Lazarev, 2014 (Cerambycidae)
- Agapanthia danilevskyi Lazarev, 2013 (Cerambycidae)
- Dorcadion cinerarium skrylniki Lazarev, 2011 (Cerambycidae)
- Dorcadion megriense Lazarev, 2009 (Cerambycidae)

== Taxa named after Lazarev ==
- Brachyta punctata lazarevi Danilevsky, 2014 (Cerambycidae)
- Callimetopus lazarevi Barševskis, 2015 (Cerambycidae)
- Xylotrechus arvicola lazarevi Danilevsky, 2016 (Cerambycidae)
- Vadonia lazarevi Vartanis, 2026 (Cerambycidae)
