= Iberodorcadion coelloi =

Scientific classification
- Kingdom: Animalia
- Phylum: Arthropoda
- Clade: Pancrustacea
- Class: Insecta
- Order: Coleoptera
- Suborder: Polyphaga
- Infraorder: Cucujiformia
- Family: Cerambycidae
- Tribe: Dorcadiini
- Genus: Iberodorcadion
- Species: I. coelloi

Binomial name
- Iberodorcadion coelloi Verdugo, 1996

Synonyms
- Dorcadion coelloi (Verdugo, 1995); Dorcadion mucidum coelloi Verdugo, 1995; Iberodorcadion mucidum coelloi Verdugo 1996

Species of beetle

Iberodorcadion coelloi is a species of longhorned beetle in the family Cerambycidae. It is found in Spain.
