= Iberodorcadion aries =

Scientific classification
- Kingdom: Animalia
- Phylum: Arthropoda
- Clade: Pancrustacea
- Class: Insecta
- Order: Coleoptera
- Suborder: Polyphaga
- Infraorder: Cucujiformia
- Family: Cerambycidae
- Tribe: Dorcadiini
- Genus: Iberodorcadion
- Species: I. aries

Binomial name
- Iberodorcadion aries Tomé & Berger, 1999

Synonyms
- Dorcadion aries (Tomé & Berger, 1999)

Species of beetle

Iberodorcadion aries is a species of longhorned beetle in the family Cerambycidae. It is found in Spain.
