= Iberodorcadion seguntianum =

Scientific classification
- Kingdom: Animalia
- Phylum: Arthropoda
- Clade: Pancrustacea
- Class: Insecta
- Order: Coleoptera
- Suborder: Polyphaga
- Infraorder: Cucujiformia
- Family: Cerambycidae
- Tribe: Dorcadiini
- Genus: Iberodorcadion
- Species: I. seguntianum

Binomial name
- Iberodorcadion seguntianum (K. Daniel & J. Daniel, 1898)

Synonyms
- Dorcadion seguntianum K. Daniel & J. Daniel, 1898; Dorcadion graellsi var. guadalajaranum Pic, 1910; Dorcadion insidiosum Escalera, 1901; Dorcadion pruinosum Escalera, 1902; Dorcadion seguntianum m. insidiosum Breuning, 1970; Dorcadion subtricolor Breuning, 1958; Dorcadion tricolor Schramm, 1910

Species of beetle

Iberodorcadion seguntianum is a species of longhorned beetle in the family Cerambycidae. It is found in Spain.
