= Iberodorcadion mosqueruelense =

Scientific classification
- Kingdom: Animalia
- Phylum: Arthropoda
- Clade: Pancrustacea
- Class: Insecta
- Order: Coleoptera
- Suborder: Polyphaga
- Infraorder: Cucujiformia
- Family: Cerambycidae
- Tribe: Dorcadiini
- Genus: Iberodorcadion
- Species: I. mosqueruelense

Binomial name
- Iberodorcadion mosqueruelense (Escalera, 1902)

Synonyms
- Dorcadion mosqueruelense Escalera, 1902; Iberodorcadion moscueruelense (Escalera, 1902) (misspelling)

Species of beetle

Iberodorcadion mosqueruelense is a species of longhorned beetle in the family Cerambycidae. It is found in Spain.
