= Iberodorcadion uhagonii =

Scientific classification
- Kingdom: Animalia
- Phylum: Arthropoda
- Clade: Pancrustacea
- Class: Insecta
- Order: Coleoptera
- Suborder: Polyphaga
- Infraorder: Cucujiformia
- Family: Cerambycidae
- Tribe: Dorcadiini
- Genus: Iberodorcadion
- Species: I. uhagonii

Binomial name
- Iberodorcadion uhagonii (Pérez-Arcas, 1868)

Synonyms
- Dorcadion uhagonii Perez-Arcas, 1868; Dorcadion griseolineatum Pic, 1894; Dorcadion lacunosum Escalera, 1908; Iberodorcadion uhagoni (Perez-Arcas) Vives, 2001 (misspelling)

Species of beetle

Iberodorcadion uhagonii is a species of longhorned beetle in the family Cerambycidae. It is found in Spain. This species has a single subspecies, Iberodorcadion uhagonii pradae.
