= Iberodorcadion albicans =

Scientific classification
- Kingdom: Animalia
- Phylum: Arthropoda
- Clade: Pancrustacea
- Class: Insecta
- Order: Coleoptera
- Suborder: Polyphaga
- Infraorder: Cucujiformia
- Family: Cerambycidae
- Tribe: Dorcadiini
- Genus: Iberodorcadion
- Species: I. albicans

Binomial name
- Iberodorcadion albicans (Chevrolat, 1862)

Species of beetle

Iberodorcadion albicans is a species of longhorned beetle in the family Cerambycidae. It is found in Spain.
