= Iberodorcadion korbi =

Scientific classification
- Kingdom: Animalia
- Phylum: Arthropoda
- Clade: Pancrustacea
- Class: Insecta
- Order: Coleoptera
- Suborder: Polyphaga
- Infraorder: Cucujiformia
- Family: Cerambycidae
- Tribe: Dorcadiini
- Genus: Iberodorcadion
- Species: I. korbi

Binomial name
- Iberodorcadion korbi (Ganglbauer, 1884)

Synonyms
- Dorcadion korbi Ganglbauer, 1884

Species of beetle

Iberodorcadion korbi is a species of longhorned beetle in the family Cerambycidae. It is found in Spain.
