= Iberodorcadion isernii =

Scientific classification
- Kingdom: Animalia
- Phylum: Arthropoda
- Clade: Pancrustacea
- Class: Insecta
- Order: Coleoptera
- Suborder: Polyphaga
- Infraorder: Cucujiformia
- Family: Cerambycidae
- Tribe: Dorcadiini
- Genus: Iberodorcadion
- Species: I. isernii

Binomial name
- Iberodorcadion isernii (Pérez-Arcas, 1868)

Synonyms
- Dorcadion isernii Perez-Arcas, 1868; Dorcadion ceballosi Breuning, 1948; Dorcadion dispersepunctatum Escalera, 1924; Dorcadion steparium Escalera, 1900; Iberodorcadion ceballosi (Breuning); Iberodorcadion iserni (Perez-Arcas, 1868) (misspelling)

Species of beetle

Iberodorcadion isernii is a species of longhorned beetle in the family Cerambycidae. It is found in Spain.
