= Iberodorcadion zarcoi =

Scientific classification
- Kingdom: Animalia
- Phylum: Arthropoda
- Clade: Pancrustacea
- Class: Insecta
- Order: Coleoptera
- Suborder: Polyphaga
- Infraorder: Cucujiformia
- Family: Cerambycidae
- Tribe: Dorcadiini
- Genus: Iberodorcadion
- Species: I. zarcoi

Binomial name
- Iberodorcadion zarcoi (Schramm, 1910)

Synonyms
- Dorcadion zarcoi Schramm, 1910

Species of beetle

Iberodorcadion zarcoi is a species of longhorned beetle in the family Cerambycidae. It is found in Spain.
