= Dorcadion etruscum =

Scientific classification
- Kingdom: Animalia
- Phylum: Arthropoda
- Clade: Pancrustacea
- Class: Insecta
- Order: Coleoptera
- Suborder: Polyphaga
- Infraorder: Cucujiformia
- Family: Cerambycidae
- Genus: Dorcadion
- Species: D. etruscum

Binomial name
- Dorcadion etruscum (Rossi, 1790)

Synonyms
- Dorcadion femoratum Brullé, 1833; Dorcadion italicum Küster, 1847; Dorcadion nudum Küster, 1852; Lamia molitor var. etrusca Rossi, 1790; Pedestredorcadion etruscum (Rossi, 1790)

Species of beetle

Dorcadion etruscum is a species of beetle in the family Cerambycidae. It was described by Pietro Rossi in 1790, originally as a varias of the species Lamia molitor. It is known from Italy, Greece, North Macedonia, Albania, and Sicily.

== Subspecies ==
- Dorcadion etruscum bravardi Pic, 1916
- Dorcadion etruscum etruscum (Rossi, 1790)
- Dorcadion etruscum fiorii Breuning, 1942
