= Iberodorcadion bolivari =

Scientific classification
- Kingdom: Animalia
- Phylum: Arthropoda
- Clade: Pancrustacea
- Class: Insecta
- Order: Coleoptera
- Suborder: Polyphaga
- Infraorder: Cucujiformia
- Family: Cerambycidae
- Tribe: Dorcadiini
- Genus: Iberodorcadion
- Species: I. bolivari

Binomial name
- Iberodorcadion bolivari (Lauffer, 1898)

Synonyms
- Dorcadion bolivari Lauffer, 1898; Dorcadion diversevittatum Pic, 1941; Dorcadion grisescens Pic, 1900; Dorcadion laufferi Pic, 1900; Dorcadion operosum Pic, 1947; Dorcadion paulovttatum Pic, 1947; Dorcadion rodriguesi Pic, 1900; Dorcadion rufipes Esealera, 1900; Dorcadion semifulvovittatum Pic, 1947; Dorcadion sparsealbum Pic, 1941; Dorcadion toledense Pie, 1947

Species of beetle

Iberodorcadion bolivari is a species of longhorned beetle in the family Cerambycidae. It is found in Spain. This species has a single subspecies, Iberodorcadion bolivari danielae.
