= Iberodorcadion martinezii =

Scientific classification
- Kingdom: Animalia
- Phylum: Arthropoda
- Clade: Pancrustacea
- Class: Insecta
- Order: Coleoptera
- Suborder: Polyphaga
- Infraorder: Cucujiformia
- Family: Cerambycidae
- Tribe: Dorcadiini
- Genus: Iberodorcadion
- Species: I. martinezii

Binomial name
- Iberodorcadion martinezii (Pérez-Arcas, 1874)

Synonyms
- Dorcadion martinezii Perez-Arcas, 1874; Dorcadion espanoli Breuning, 1956; Iberodorcadion espanoli (Breuning, 1956); Iberodorcadion martinezi Perez-Arcas, 1874 (misspelling)

Species of beetle

Iberodorcadion martinezii is a species of longhorned beetle in the family Cerambycidae. It is found in Spain.
