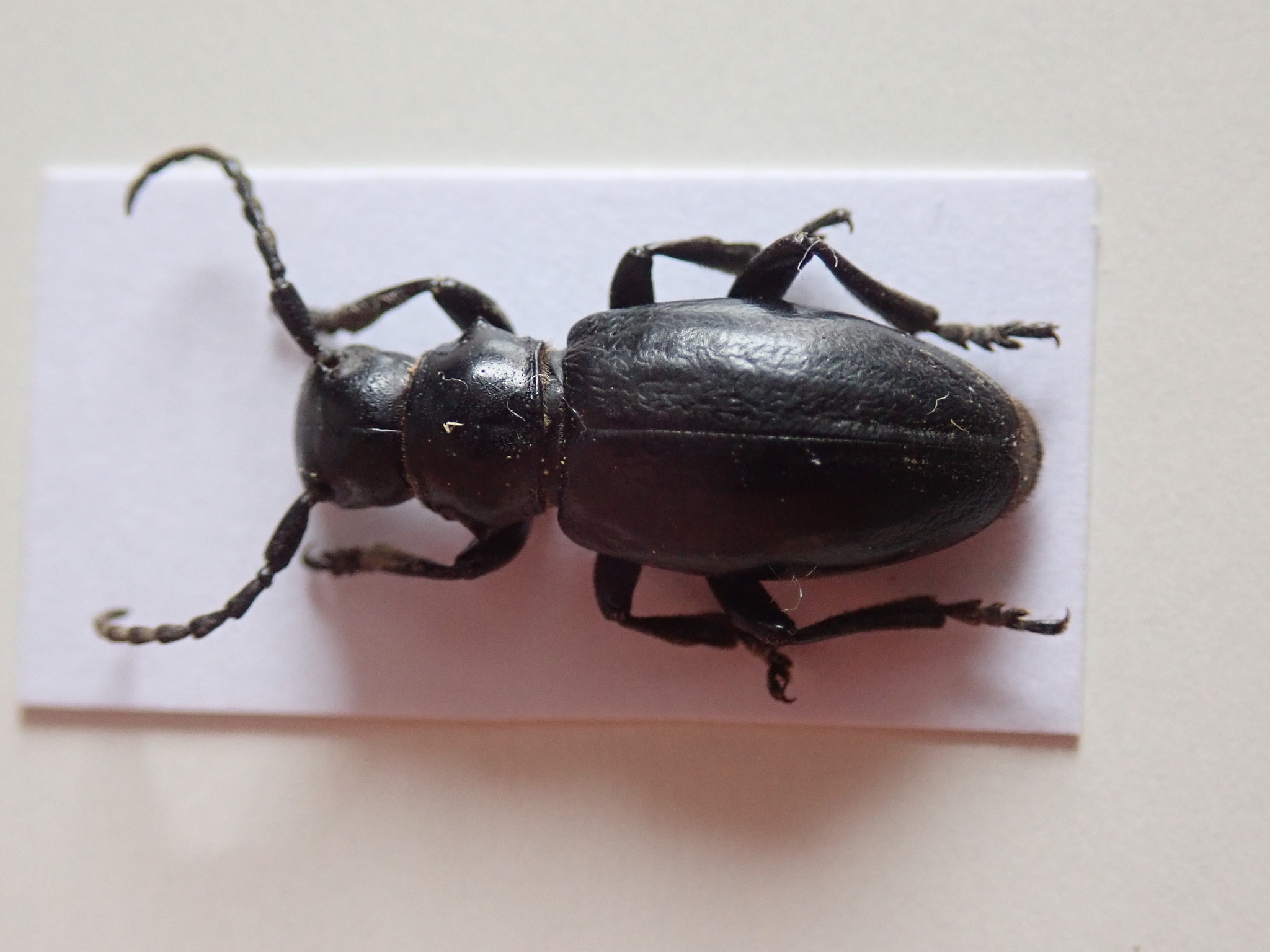
- Iberodorcadion lorquinii, Spain

Scientific classification
- Kingdom: Animalia
- Phylum: Arthropoda
- Clade: Pancrustacea
- Class: Insecta
- Order: Coleoptera
- Suborder: Polyphaga
- Infraorder: Cucujiformia
- Family: Cerambycidae
- Tribe: Dorcadiini
- Genus: Iberodorcadion
- Species: I. lorquinii

Binomial name
- Iberodorcadion lorquinii (Fairmaire, 1855)

Synonyms
- Dorcadion lorquinii Fairmaire, 1885

= Iberodorcadion lorquinii =

Species of beetle

Iberodorcadion lorquinii is a species of longhorned beetle in the family Cerambycidae. It is found in Spain. This species has a single subspecies, Iberodorcadion lorquinii cobosi.
