= Iberodorcadion marmottani =

Scientific classification
- Kingdom: Animalia
- Phylum: Arthropoda
- Clade: Pancrustacea
- Class: Insecta
- Order: Coleoptera
- Suborder: Polyphaga
- Infraorder: Cucujiformia
- Family: Cerambycidae
- Tribe: Dorcadiini
- Genus: Iberodorcadion
- Species: I. marmottani

Binomial name
- Iberodorcadion marmottani (Escalera, 1900)

Synonyms
- Dorcadion marmottani Escalera, 1900; Dorcadion marmottani robustioripenne Pic, 1941

Species of beetle

Iberodorcadion marmottani is a species of longhorned beetle in the family Cerambycidae. It is found in Spain.
