= Iberodorcadion ferdinandi =

Scientific classification
- Kingdom: Animalia
- Phylum: Arthropoda
- Clade: Pancrustacea
- Class: Insecta
- Order: Coleoptera
- Suborder: Polyphaga
- Infraorder: Cucujiformia
- Family: Cerambycidae
- Tribe: Dorcadiini
- Genus: Iberodorcadion
- Species: I. ferdinandi

Binomial name
- Iberodorcadion ferdinandi (Escalera, 1900)

Synonyms
- Dorcadion ferdinandi Escalera, 1900

Species of beetle

Iberodorcadion ferdinandi is a species of longhorned beetle in the family Cerambycidae. It is found in Spain.
