= Iberodorcadion atlantis =

Scientific classification
- Kingdom: Animalia
- Phylum: Arthropoda
- Clade: Pancrustacea
- Class: Insecta
- Order: Coleoptera
- Suborder: Polyphaga
- Infraorder: Cucujiformia
- Family: Cerambycidae
- Tribe: Dorcadiini
- Genus: Iberodorcadion
- Species: I. atlantis

Binomial name
- Iberodorcadion atlantis (Bedel, 1921)

Species of beetle

Iberodorcadion atlantis is a species of longhorned beetle in the family Cerambycidae. It is found in Morocco.
