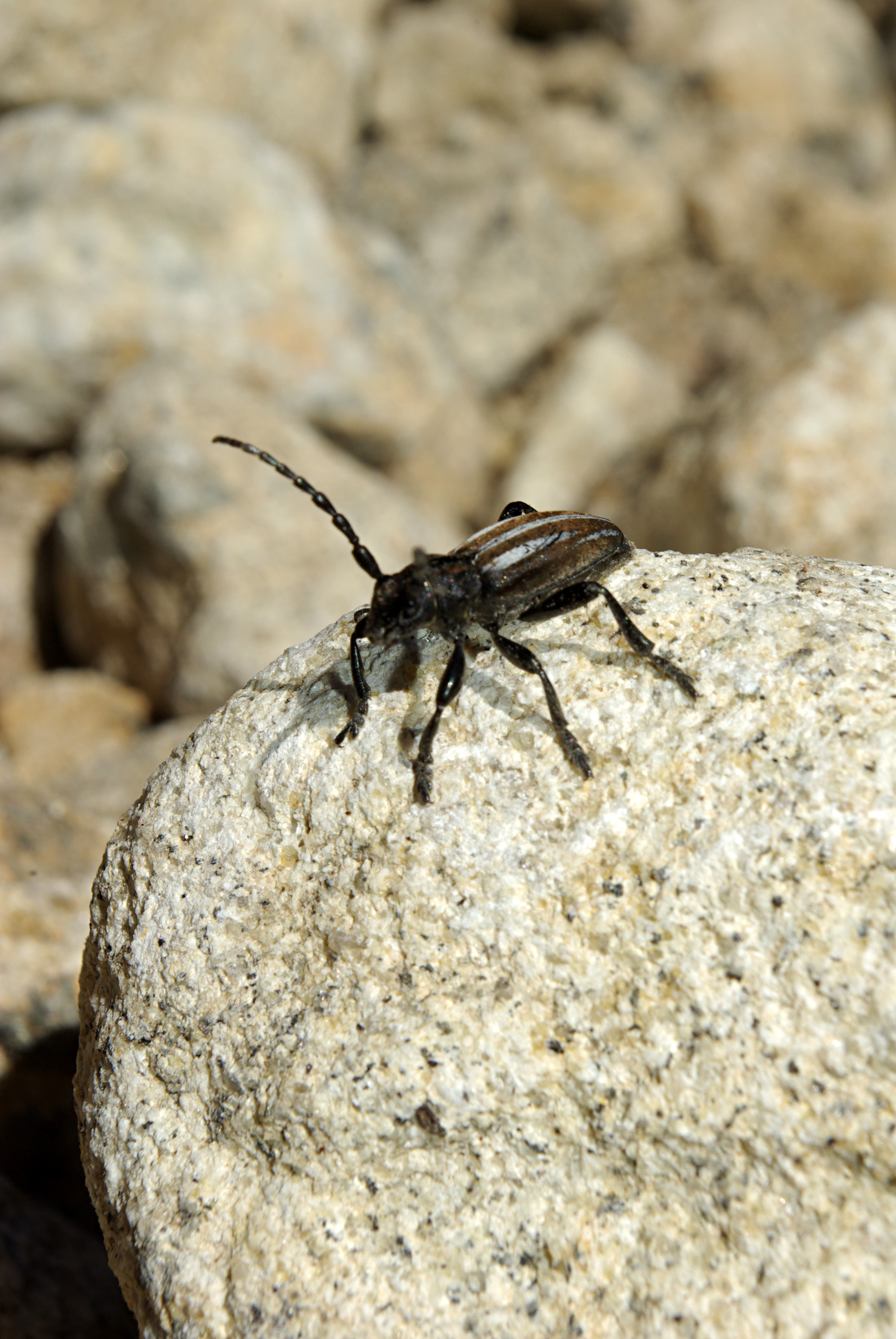

Scientific classification
- Kingdom: Animalia
- Phylum: Arthropoda
- Clade: Pancrustacea
- Class: Insecta
- Order: Coleoptera
- Suborder: Polyphaga
- Infraorder: Cucujiformia
- Family: Cerambycidae
- Tribe: Dorcadiini
- Genus: Iberodorcadion
- Species: I. segovianum

Binomial name
- Iberodorcadion segovianum (Chevrolat, 1862)

Synonyms
- Dorcadion segovianum Chevrolat, 1862

= Iberodorcadion segovianum =

Species of beetle

Iberodorcadion segovianum is a species of longhorned beetle in the family Cerambycidae. It is found in Spain. This species has a single subspecies, Iberodorcadion segovianum dejeanii.
