= Iberodorcadion lusitanicum =

Scientific classification
- Kingdom: Animalia
- Phylum: Arthropoda
- Clade: Pancrustacea
- Class: Insecta
- Order: Coleoptera
- Suborder: Polyphaga
- Infraorder: Cucujiformia
- Family: Cerambycidae
- Tribe: Dorcadiini
- Genus: Iberodorcadion
- Species: I. lusitanicum

Binomial name
- Iberodorcadion lusitanicum (Chevrolat, 1840)

Synonyms
- Dorcadion lusitanicum Chevrolat, 1840

Species of beetle

Iberodorcadion lusitanicum is a species of longhorned beetle in the family Cerambycidae. It is found in Portugal, Spain. This species has a single subspecies, Iberodorcadion lusitanicum evorense.
