= Iberodorcadion mimomucidum =

Scientific classification
- Kingdom: Animalia
- Phylum: Arthropoda
- Clade: Pancrustacea
- Class: Insecta
- Order: Coleoptera
- Suborder: Polyphaga
- Infraorder: Cucujiformia
- Family: Cerambycidae
- Tribe: Dorcadiini
- Genus: Iberodorcadion
- Species: I. mimomucidum

Binomial name
- Iberodorcadion mimomucidum (Breuning, 1976)

Synonyms
- Dorcadion mimomucidum Breuning, 1976; Iberodorcadion lusitanicum mimomucidum (Breuning, 1976)

Species of beetle

Iberodorcadion mimomucidum is a species of longhorned beetle in the family Cerambycidae. It is found in Portugal.
