= Iberodorcadion pseudomolitor =

Scientific classification
- Kingdom: Animalia
- Phylum: Arthropoda
- Clade: Pancrustacea
- Class: Insecta
- Order: Coleoptera
- Suborder: Polyphaga
- Infraorder: Cucujiformia
- Family: Cerambycidae
- Tribe: Dorcadiini
- Genus: Iberodorcadion
- Species: I. pseudomolitor

Binomial name
- Iberodorcadion pseudomolitor (Escalera, 1902)

Synonyms
- Dorcadion pseudomolitor Escalera, 1902; Dorcadion mosqueruelense var. pseudomolitor Escalera, 1902

Species of beetle

Iberodorcadion pseudomolitor is a species of longhorn beetle in the family Cerambycidae. It was described by Escalera in 1902, originally as a varietas of the species Dorcadion mosqueruelense. It is found in Spain.
