= Iberodorcadion fuentei =

Scientific classification
- Kingdom: Animalia
- Phylum: Arthropoda
- Clade: Pancrustacea
- Class: Insecta
- Order: Coleoptera
- Suborder: Polyphaga
- Infraorder: Cucujiformia
- Family: Cerambycidae
- Tribe: Dorcadiini
- Genus: Iberodorcadion
- Species: I. fuentei

Binomial name
- Iberodorcadion fuentei (Pic, 1899)

Synonyms
- Dorcadion fuentei Pic, 1899; Dorcadion elvirae Pic, 1904

Species of beetle

Iberodorcadion fuentei is a species of longhorned beetle in the family Cerambycidae. It is found in Spain.
