= Iberodorcadion heydenii =

Scientific classification
- Kingdom: Animalia
- Phylum: Arthropoda
- Clade: Pancrustacea
- Class: Insecta
- Order: Coleoptera
- Suborder: Polyphaga
- Infraorder: Cucujiformia
- Family: Cerambycidae
- Tribe: Dorcadiini
- Genus: Iberodorcadion
- Species: I. heydenii

Binomial name
- Iberodorcadion heydenii (Kraatz, 1870)

Synonyms
- Dorcadion heydenii Kraatz, 1870; Dorcadion internelineatum Breuning, 1958; Dorcadion heydeni (Kraatz) (misspelling); Iberodorcadion heydeni Kraatz, 1870 (misspelling)

Species of beetle

Iberodorcadion heydenii is a species of longhorned beetle in the family Cerambycidae. It is found in Spain.
