= Iberodorcadion zenete =

Scientific classification
- Kingdom: Animalia
- Phylum: Arthropoda
- Clade: Pancrustacea
- Class: Insecta
- Order: Coleoptera
- Suborder: Polyphaga
- Infraorder: Cucujiformia
- Family: Cerambycidae
- Tribe: Dorcadiini
- Genus: Iberodorcadion
- Species: I. zenete

Binomial name
- Iberodorcadion zenete Anichtchenko & Verdugo, 2004

Synonyms
- Dorcadion zenete (Anichtchenko & Verdugo, 2004)

Species of beetle

Iberodorcadion zenete is a species of longhorned beetle in the family Cerambycidae. It is found in Spain.
