= Iberodorcadion graellsii =

Scientific classification
- Kingdom: Animalia
- Phylum: Arthropoda
- Clade: Pancrustacea
- Class: Insecta
- Order: Coleoptera
- Suborder: Polyphaga
- Infraorder: Cucujiformia
- Family: Cerambycidae
- Tribe: Dorcadiini
- Genus: Iberodorcadion
- Species: I. graellsii

Binomial name
- Iberodorcadion graellsii (Graëlls, 1858)

Synonyms
- Dorcadion graellsii Graells, 1858; Dorcadion alternatum Chevrolat, 1862

Species of beetle

Iberodorcadion graellsii is a species of longhorned beetle in the family Cerambycidae. It is found in Spain.
