= Rondae =

Rondae may refer to:

- Rondae Hollis-Jefferson, American-Jordanian basketball player
- Dorcadion rondae, a synonym for Iberodorcadion mus, a species of beetle
- Erysimum rondae, a species of flowering plant
