= Iberodorcadion suturale =

Scientific classification
- Kingdom: Animalia
- Phylum: Arthropoda
- Clade: Pancrustacea
- Class: Insecta
- Order: Coleoptera
- Suborder: Polyphaga
- Infraorder: Cucujiformia
- Family: Cerambycidae
- Tribe: Dorcadiini
- Genus: Iberodorcadion
- Species: I. suturale

Binomial name
- Iberodorcadion suturale (Chevrolat, 1862)

Synonyms
- Dorcadion suturale Chevrolat, 1862; Dorcadion suturaloide Breuning, 1958; Dorcadion suturaloide m. valenciae Breuning, 1962

Species of beetle

Iberodorcadion suturale is a species of longhorned beetle in the family Cerambycidae. It is found in Spain.
