= Iberodorcadion mucidum =

Scientific classification
- Kingdom: Animalia
- Phylum: Arthropoda
- Clade: Pancrustacea
- Class: Insecta
- Order: Coleoptera
- Suborder: Polyphaga
- Infraorder: Cucujiformia
- Family: Cerambycidae
- Tribe: Dorcadiini
- Genus: Iberodorcadion
- Species: I. mucidum

Binomial name
- Iberodorcadion mucidum (Dalman, 1817)

Synonyms
- Lamia (Dorcadion) mucida Dalman, 1817; Dorcadion mucidum (Dalman, 1817); Dorcadion (Iberodorcadion) mucidum (Dalman, 1817); Baeticodorcadion mucidum (Dalman, 1817); Dorcadion mucidum nigrosparsum Pic, 1941; Iberodorcadion mucidum nigrosparsum (Pic, 1941); Iberodorcadion nigrosparsum (Pic, 1941); Iberodorcadion (Baeticodorcadion) nigrosparsum (Pic, 1941)

Species of beetle

Iberodorcadion mucidum is a species of longhorned beetle in the family Cerambycidae. It is found in Spain.

Iberodorcadion mucidum measure 14–24 mm (0.55–0.94 in) in length.
