= Iberodorcadion terolense =

Scientific classification
- Kingdom: Animalia
- Phylum: Arthropoda
- Clade: Pancrustacea
- Class: Insecta
- Order: Coleoptera
- Suborder: Polyphaga
- Infraorder: Cucujiformia
- Family: Cerambycidae
- Tribe: Dorcadiini
- Genus: Iberodorcadion
- Species: I. terolense

Binomial name
- Iberodorcadion terolense (Escalera, 1902)

Synonyms
- Dorcadion terolense Escalera, 1902; Dorcadion albarium Escalera, 1902; Dorcadion terolense m. flaimum Breuning, 1970; Dorcadion terolense m. fuscovittipenne Breuning, 1970; Dorcadion terolense m. subflavidum Breuning, 1971

Species of beetle

Iberodorcadion terolense is a species of longhorned beetle in the family Cerambycidae. It is found in Spain.
