= Iberodorcadion neilense =

Scientific classification
- Kingdom: Animalia
- Phylum: Arthropoda
- Clade: Pancrustacea
- Class: Insecta
- Order: Coleoptera
- Suborder: Polyphaga
- Infraorder: Cucujiformia
- Family: Cerambycidae
- Tribe: Dorcadiini
- Genus: Iberodorcadion
- Species: I. neilense

Binomial name
- Iberodorcadion neilense (Escalera, 1902)

Synonyms
- Dorcadion neilense Escalera, 1902; Dorcadion neilense var. almarzense (Escalera) Nicolas, 1904; Dorcadion neilense var. clarevittipenne Breuning, 1970; Dorcadion neilense var. durani Breuning, 1962; Iberodorcadion almarzense (Escalera) Vives, 1976; Iberodorcadion neilense var. almarzense (Escalera) Romero-Samper, 2002; Dorcadion neilense (Escalera) Nicolas, 1904 (partim.)

Species of beetle

Iberodorcadion neilense is a species of longhorned beetle in the family Cerambycidae. It is found in Spain.
