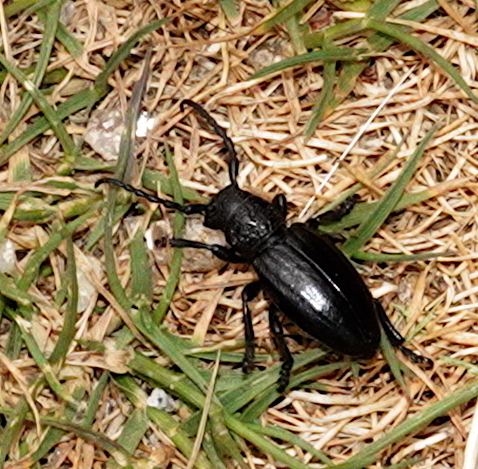
- Iberodorcadion brannani, Portugal

Scientific classification
- Kingdom: Animalia
- Phylum: Arthropoda
- Clade: Pancrustacea
- Class: Insecta
- Order: Coleoptera
- Suborder: Polyphaga
- Infraorder: Cucujiformia
- Family: Cerambycidae
- Genus: Iberodorcadion
- Species: I. brannani

Binomial name
- Iberodorcadion brannani (Schaufuß, 1870)

Synonyms
- Dorcadion brannani Schaufuss, 1870; Dorcadion lategriseovittatum Breuning, 1958

= Iberodorcadion brannani =

Species of beetle

Iberodorcadion brannani is a species of longhorned beetle in the family Cerambycidae. It is found in Portugal and Spain.
