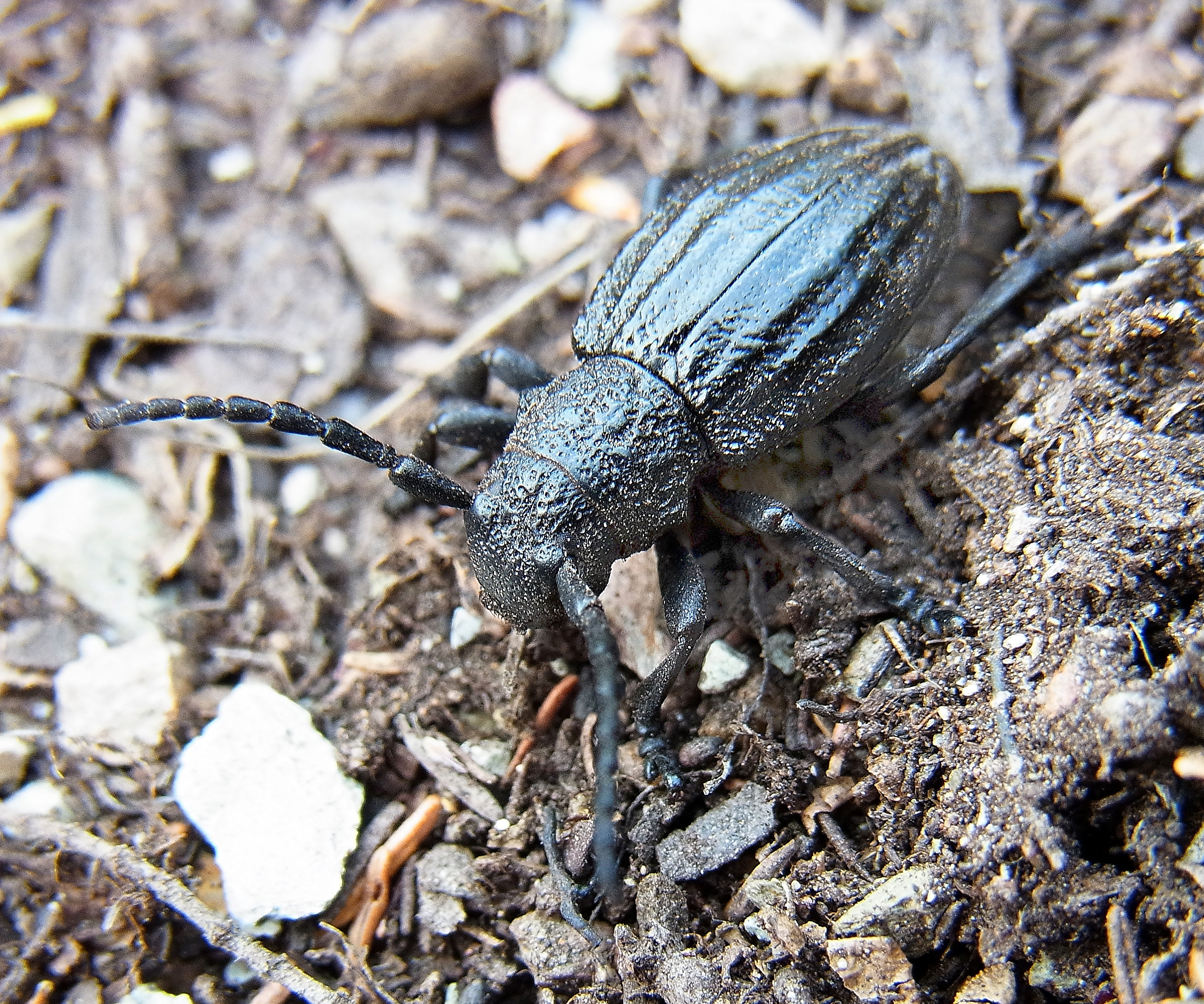
- Iberodorcadion seoanei, Spain

Scientific classification
- Kingdom: Animalia
- Phylum: Arthropoda
- Clade: Pancrustacea
- Class: Insecta
- Order: Coleoptera
- Suborder: Polyphaga
- Infraorder: Cucujiformia
- Family: Cerambycidae
- Genus: Iberodorcadion
- Species: I. seoanei

Binomial name
- Iberodorcadion seoanei (Graëlls, 1858)

Synonyms
- Dorcadion seoanei

= Iberodorcadion seoanei =

Species of beetle

Iberodorcadion seoanei is a species of longhorned beetle in the family Cerambycidae. It is found in Spain.

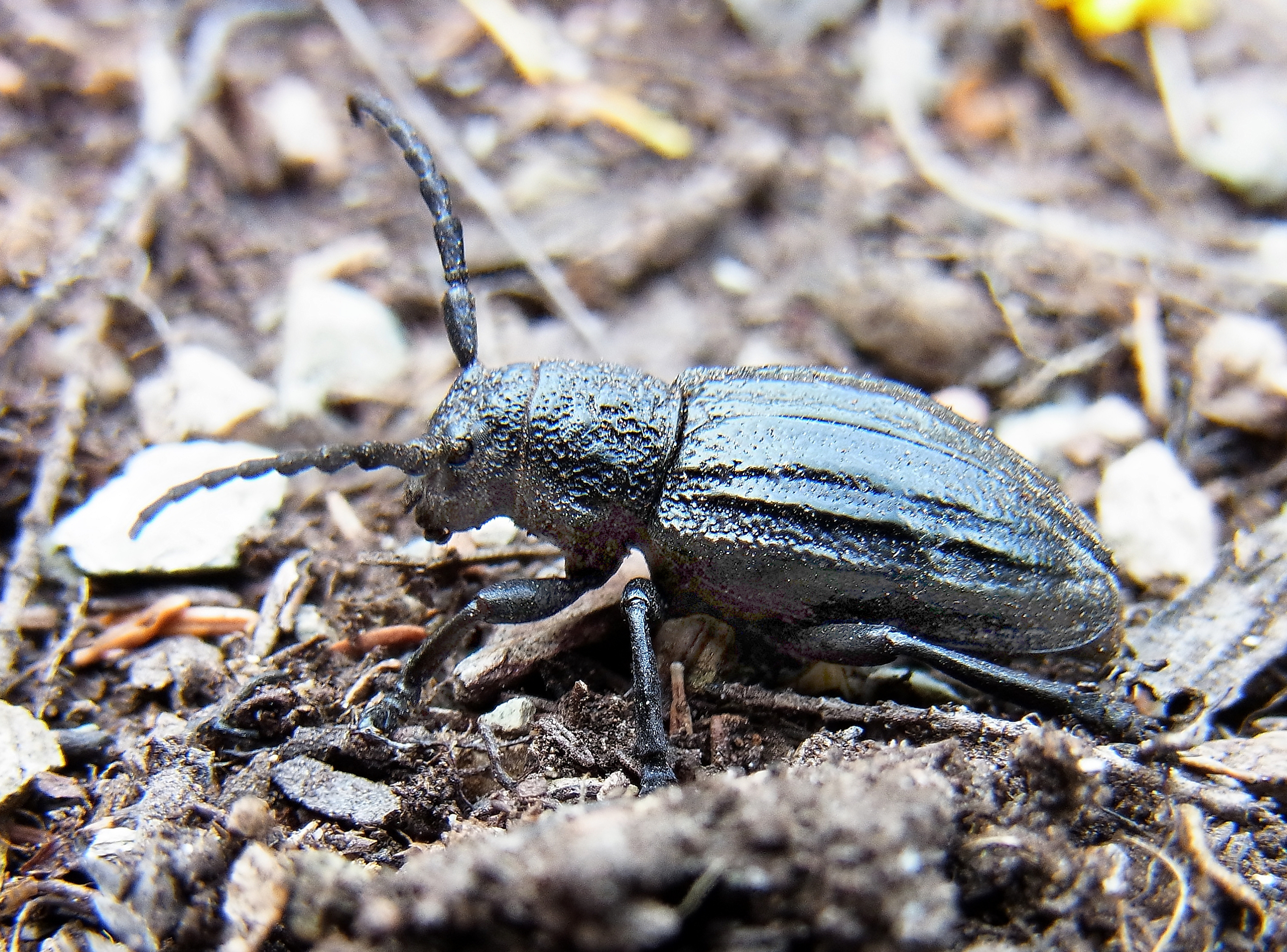
Iberodorcadion seoanei, Spain
