= Parmenomorpha wasselli =

Scientific classification
- Kingdom: Animalia
- Phylum: Arthropoda
- Class: Insecta
- Order: Coleoptera
- Suborder: Polyphaga
- Infraorder: Cucujiformia
- Family: Cerambycidae
- Genus: Parmenomorpha
- Species: P. wasselli

Binomial name
- Parmenomorpha wasselli Carter, 1932

Synonyms
- Parmenomorpha wasselti Carter, 1932

Species of beetle

Parmenomorpha wasselli is a species of beetle in the family Cerambycidae. It was described by Carter in 1932. It is known from Australia.
