= Neodorcadion orientale =

Scientific classification
- Kingdom: Animalia
- Phylum: Arthropoda
- Class: Insecta
- Order: Coleoptera
- Suborder: Polyphaga
- Infraorder: Cucujiformia
- Family: Cerambycidae
- Genus: Neodorcadion
- Species: N. orientale

Binomial name
- Neodorcadion orientale Ganglbauer, 1883

Synonyms
- Neodorcadion balcanicum var. orientale Ganglbauer, 1883; Neodorcadion flaschneri Pic, 1889

Species of beetle

Neodorcadion orientale is a species of beetle in the family Cerambycidae. It was described by Ludwig Ganglbauer in 1883, originally as a varietas of the species Neodorcadion balcanicum. It is known from Turkey.

== Subspecies ==
- Neodorcadion orientale var. dispar Pic, 1892
- Neodorcadion orientale var. merkli Pic, 1892
