= Corestheta minima =

Scientific classification
- Kingdom: Animalia
- Phylum: Arthropoda
- Class: Insecta
- Order: Coleoptera
- Suborder: Polyphaga
- Infraorder: Cucujiformia
- Family: Cerambycidae
- Genus: Corestheta
- Species: C. minima

Binomial name
- Corestheta minima Breuning, 1958

Species of beetle

Corestheta minima is a species of beetle in the family Cerambycidae. It was described by Stephan von Breuning in 1958. It is known from Australia.
