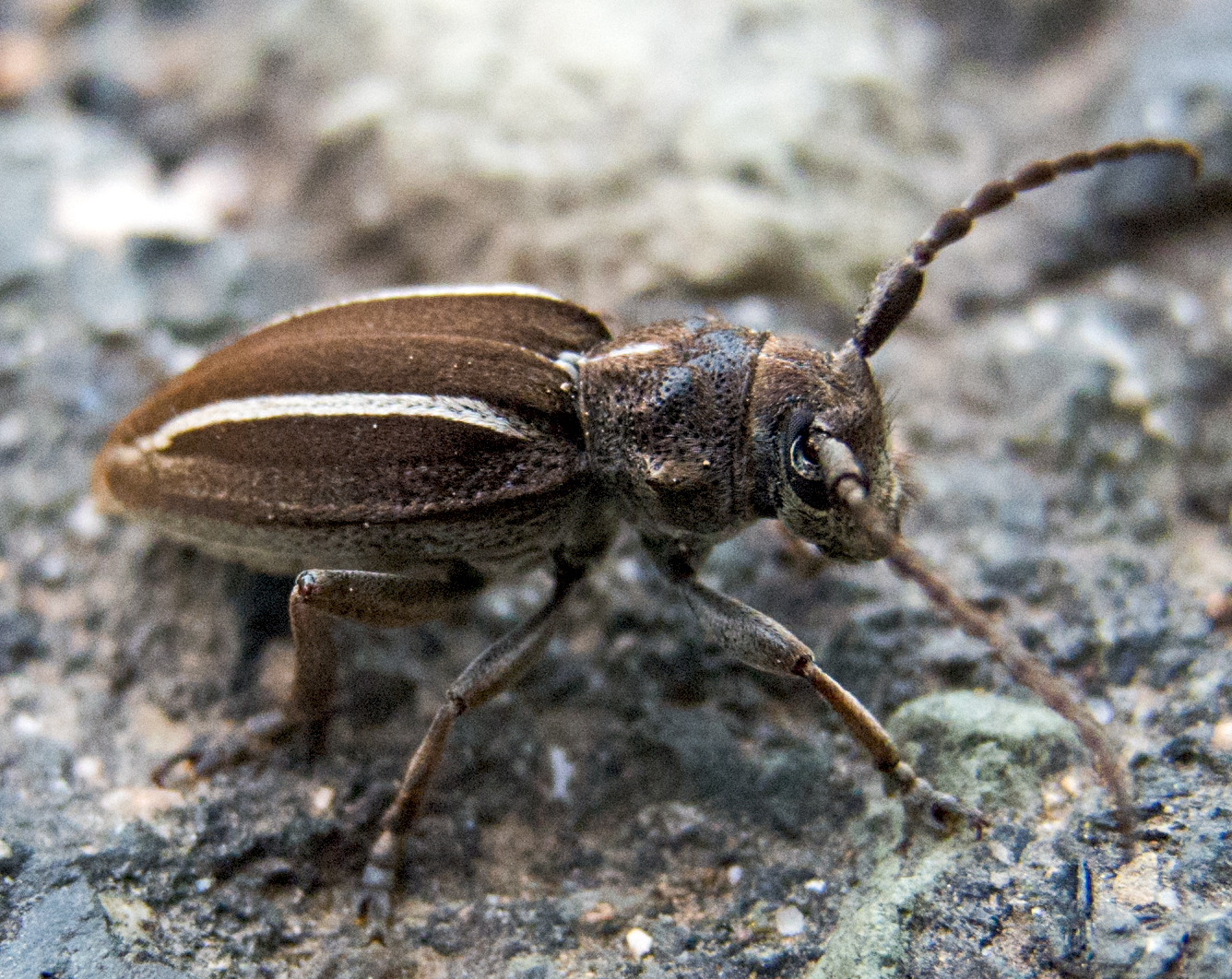

Scientific classification
- Kingdom: Animalia
- Phylum: Arthropoda
- Class: Insecta
- Order: Coleoptera
- Suborder: Polyphaga
- Infraorder: Cucujiformia
- Family: Cerambycidae
- Genus: Neodorcadion
- Species: N. bilineatum

Binomial name
- Neodorcadion bilineatum (Germar, 1824)

Synonyms
- Dorcadion bilineatum (Germar) Germar, 1839; Lamia bilineata Germar, 1824; Neodorcadion pelleti m. reductevittatum Breuning, 1962

= Neodorcadion bilineatum =

Species of beetle

Neodorcadion bilineatum is a species of beetle in the family Cerambycidae. It was described by Ernst Friedrich Germar in 1824. It is known from Romania, Bosnia and Herzegovina, Hungary, Croatia, North Macedonia, Slovakia, Bulgaria, Greece, Moldova, Montenegro, Albania, Turkey, Serbia, and Ukraine. It measures between 12 and 14 mm (0.47 and 0.55 in).
