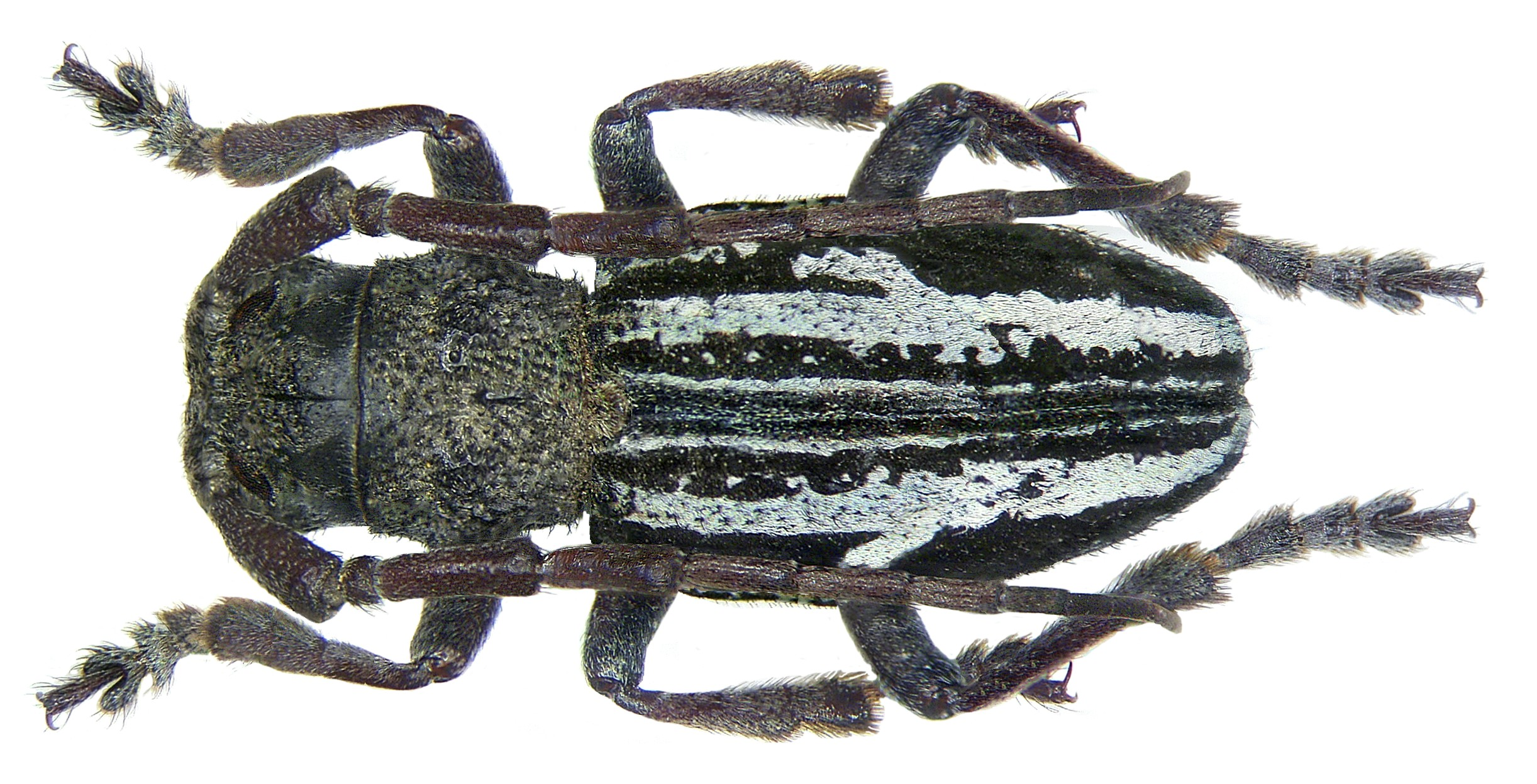

Scientific classification
- Kingdom: Animalia
- Phylum: Arthropoda
- Class: Insecta
- Order: Coleoptera
- Suborder: Polyphaga
- Infraorder: Cucujiformia
- Family: Cerambycidae
- Genus: Trichodorcadion
- Species: T. gardneri

Binomial name
- Trichodorcadion gardneri Breuning, 1942

= Trichodorcadion gardneri =

Species of beetle

Trichodorcadion gardneri is a species of beetle in the family Cerambycidae. It was described by Stephan von Breuning in 1942. It is known from Nepal and India.
