= Corestheta insularis =

Scientific classification
- Kingdom: Animalia
- Phylum: Arthropoda
- Class: Insecta
- Order: Coleoptera
- Suborder: Polyphaga
- Infraorder: Cucujiformia
- Family: Cerambycidae
- Genus: Corestheta
- Species: C. insularis

Binomial name
- Corestheta insularis Pascoe, 1875

Synonyms
- Corestetha insularis Pascoe, 1875

Species of beetle

Corestheta insularis is a species of beetle in the family Cerambycidae. It was described by Pascoe in 1875. It is known from Australia.
