= Iberodorcadion castilianum =

Scientific classification
- Kingdom: Animalia
- Phylum: Arthropoda
- Clade: Pancrustacea
- Class: Insecta
- Order: Coleoptera
- Suborder: Polyphaga
- Infraorder: Cucujiformia
- Family: Cerambycidae
- Genus: Iberodorcadion
- Species: I. castilianum

Binomial name
- Iberodorcadion castilianum (Chevrolat, 1862)

Synonyms
- Dorcadion castilianum Chevrolat, 1862

Species of beetle

Iberodorcadion castilianum is a species of longhorned beetle in the family Cerambycidae. It is found in Spain.
