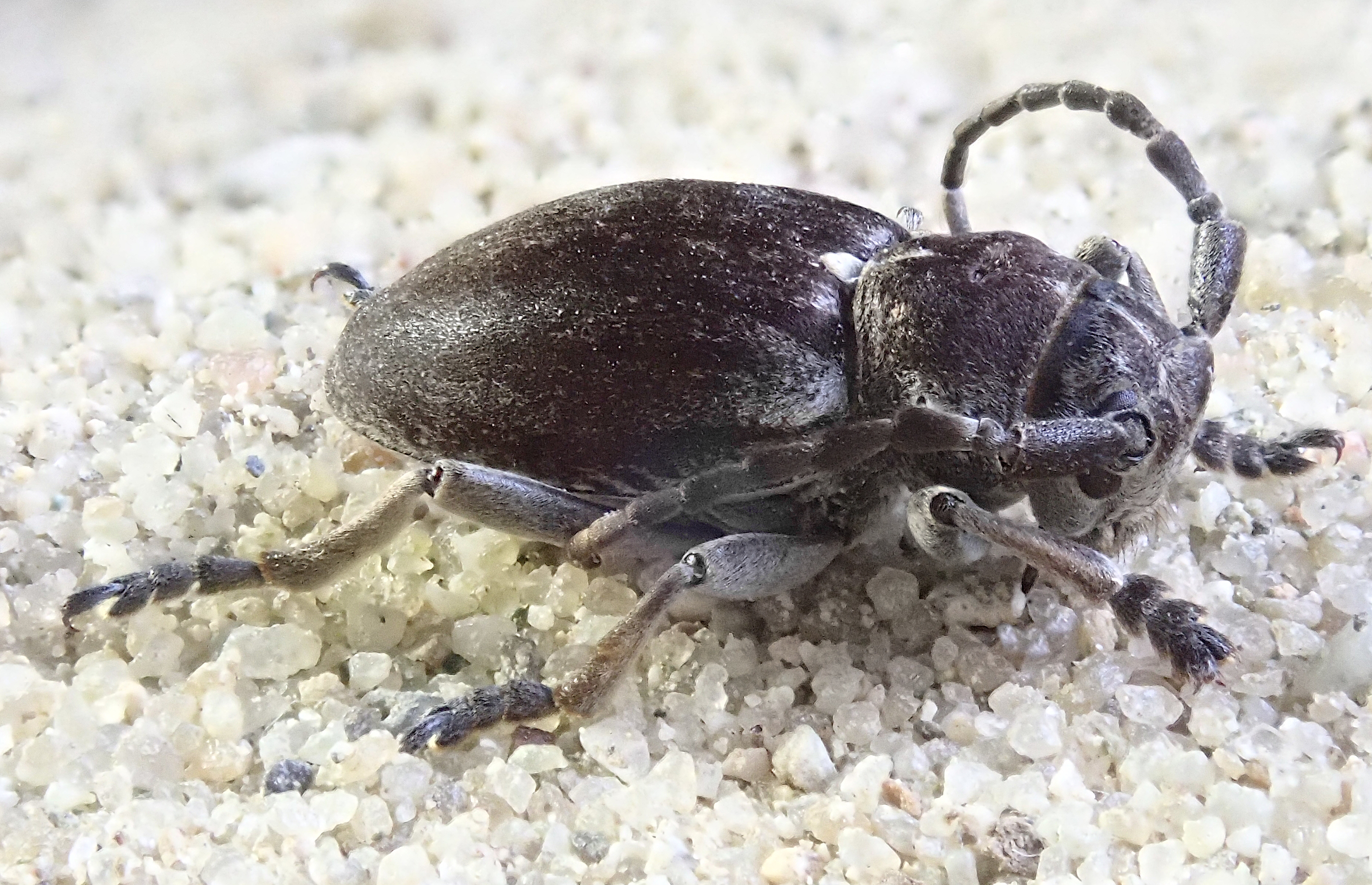

Scientific classification
- Kingdom: Animalia
- Phylum: Arthropoda
- Class: Insecta
- Order: Coleoptera
- Suborder: Polyphaga
- Infraorder: Cucujiformia
- Family: Cerambycidae
- Genus: Neodorcadion
- Species: N. virleti

Binomial name
- Neodorcadion virleti (Brullé, 1833)

Synonyms
- Dorcadion virleti Brullé, 1833; Neodorcadion ionicum Pic, 1901

= Neodorcadion virleti =

Species of beetle

Neodorcadion virleti is a species of beetle in the family Cerambycidae. It was described by Brullé in 1833, originally under the genus Dorcadion. It is known from Greece.

== Varietas ==
- Neodorcadion virleti var. acarnanicum Pic, 1914
- Neodorcadion virleti var. subbinotatum Pic, 1914
