= Corestheta alternata =

Scientific classification
- Kingdom: Animalia
- Phylum: Arthropoda
- Class: Insecta
- Order: Coleoptera
- Suborder: Polyphaga
- Infraorder: Cucujiformia
- Family: Cerambycidae
- Genus: Corestheta
- Species: C. alternata

Binomial name
- Corestheta alternata Carter, 1929

Species of beetle

Corestheta alternata is a species of beetle in the family Cerambycidae. It was described by Carter in 1929. It is known from Australia.
