= Oricopis maculiventris =

Scientific classification
- Kingdom: Animalia
- Phylum: Arthropoda
- Clade: Pancrustacea
- Class: Insecta
- Order: Coleoptera
- Suborder: Polyphaga
- Infraorder: Cucujiformia
- Family: Cerambycidae
- Genus: Oricopis
- Species: O. maculiventris

Binomial name
- Oricopis maculiventris Lea, 1917

Species of beetle

Oricopis maculiventris is a species of beetle in the family Cerambycidae. It was described by Arthur Mills Lea in 1917. It is known from Australia.
