= Neodorcadion fallax =

Scientific classification
- Kingdom: Animalia
- Phylum: Arthropoda
- Class: Insecta
- Order: Coleoptera
- Suborder: Polyphaga
- Infraorder: Cucujiformia
- Family: Cerambycidae
- Genus: Neodorcadion
- Species: N. fallax

Binomial name
- Neodorcadion fallax (Kraatz, 1873)

Synonyms
- Dorcadion fallax Kraatz, 1873

Species of beetle

Neodorcadion fallax is a species of beetle in the family Cerambycidae. It was described by Kraatz in 1873. It is known from Greece.
