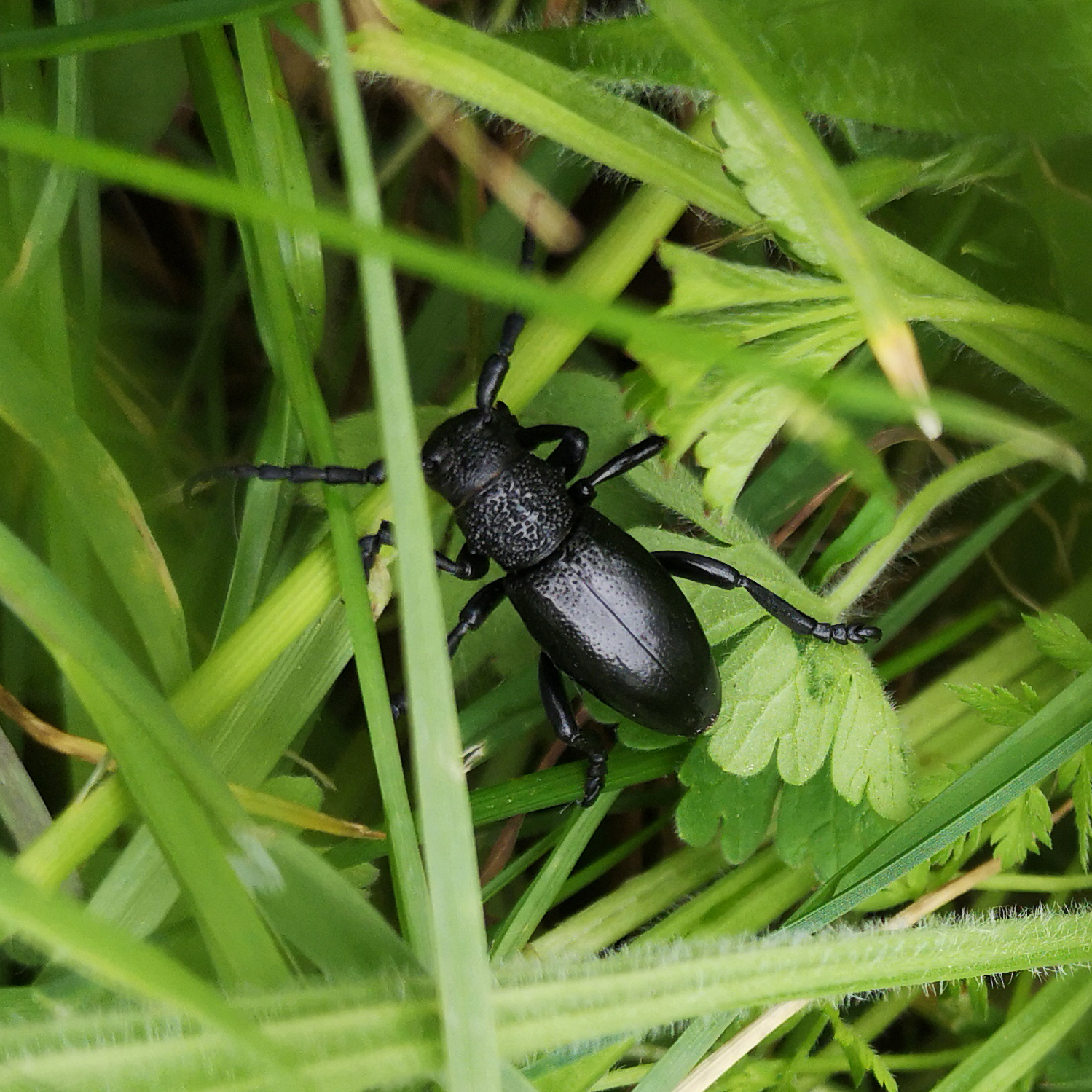
- Iberodorcadion spinolae, Spain

Scientific classification
- Kingdom: Animalia
- Phylum: Arthropoda
- Clade: Pancrustacea
- Class: Insecta
- Order: Coleoptera
- Suborder: Polyphaga
- Infraorder: Cucujiformia
- Family: Cerambycidae
- Genus: Iberodorcadion
- Species: I. spinolae

Binomial name
- Iberodorcadion spinolae (Dalman, 1817)

Synonyms
- Dorcadion spinolae Dalman, 1817; Dorcadion mulsanti Brisout, 1866; Dorcadion soricinum Chevrolat, 1862; Iberodorcadion basigranosum (Breuning); Lamia spinolae Dalman, 1817

= Iberodorcadion spinolae =

Species of beetle

Iberodorcadion spinolae is a species of longhorned beetle in the family Cerambycidae. It is found in Spain.
