= Oricopis mediofasciatus =

Scientific classification
- Kingdom: Animalia
- Phylum: Arthropoda
- Class: Insecta
- Order: Coleoptera
- Suborder: Polyphaga
- Infraorder: Cucujiformia
- Family: Cerambycidae
- Genus: Oricopis
- Species: O. mediofasciatus

Binomial name
- Oricopis mediofasciatus Breuning, 1959

Species of beetle

Oricopis mediofasciatus is a species of beetle in the family Cerambycidae. It was described by Stephan von Breuning in 1959.
