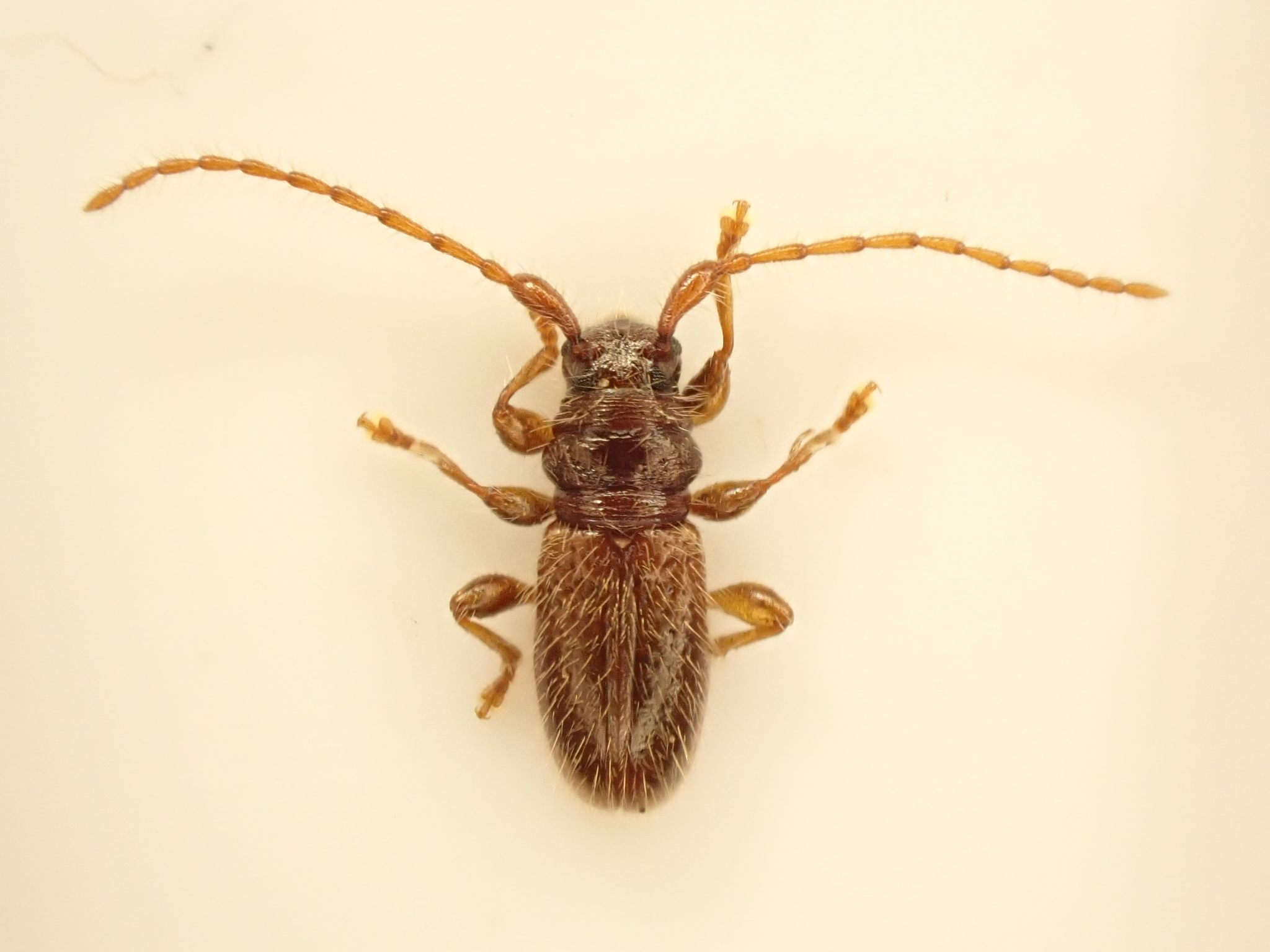
- Microlamia pygmaea

Scientific classification
- Kingdom: Animalia
- Phylum: Arthropoda
- Clade: Pancrustacea
- Class: Insecta
- Order: Coleoptera
- Suborder: Polyphaga
- Infraorder: Cucujiformia
- Family: Cerambycidae
- Tribe: Dorcadiini
- Genus: Microlamia; Bates, 1874

Synonyms
- Parapteridotelus Breuning, 1962; Mimoxylotoles Breuning, 1962

= Microlamia =

Genus of beetles

Microlamia is a genus of longhorn beetles belonging to the subfamily Lamiinae (flat-faced longhorns). Species belonging to this genus can be found in Australia and New Zealand.

== Species ==
Microlamia contains the following species:

- Microlamia elongata Breuning, 1940
- Microlamia norfolkensis Breuning, 1947
- Microlamia pygmaea Bates, 1874
- Microlamia viridis Slipinski & Escalona, 2013
