= Oricopis rufescens =

Scientific classification
- Kingdom: Animalia
- Phylum: Arthropoda
- Class: Insecta
- Order: Coleoptera
- Suborder: Polyphaga
- Infraorder: Cucujiformia
- Family: Cerambycidae
- Genus: Oricopis
- Species: O. rufescens

Binomial name
- Oricopis rufescens (Breuning, 1969)

Species of beetle

Oricopis rufescens is a species of beetle in the family Cerambycidae. It was described by Stephan von Breuning in 1969.
