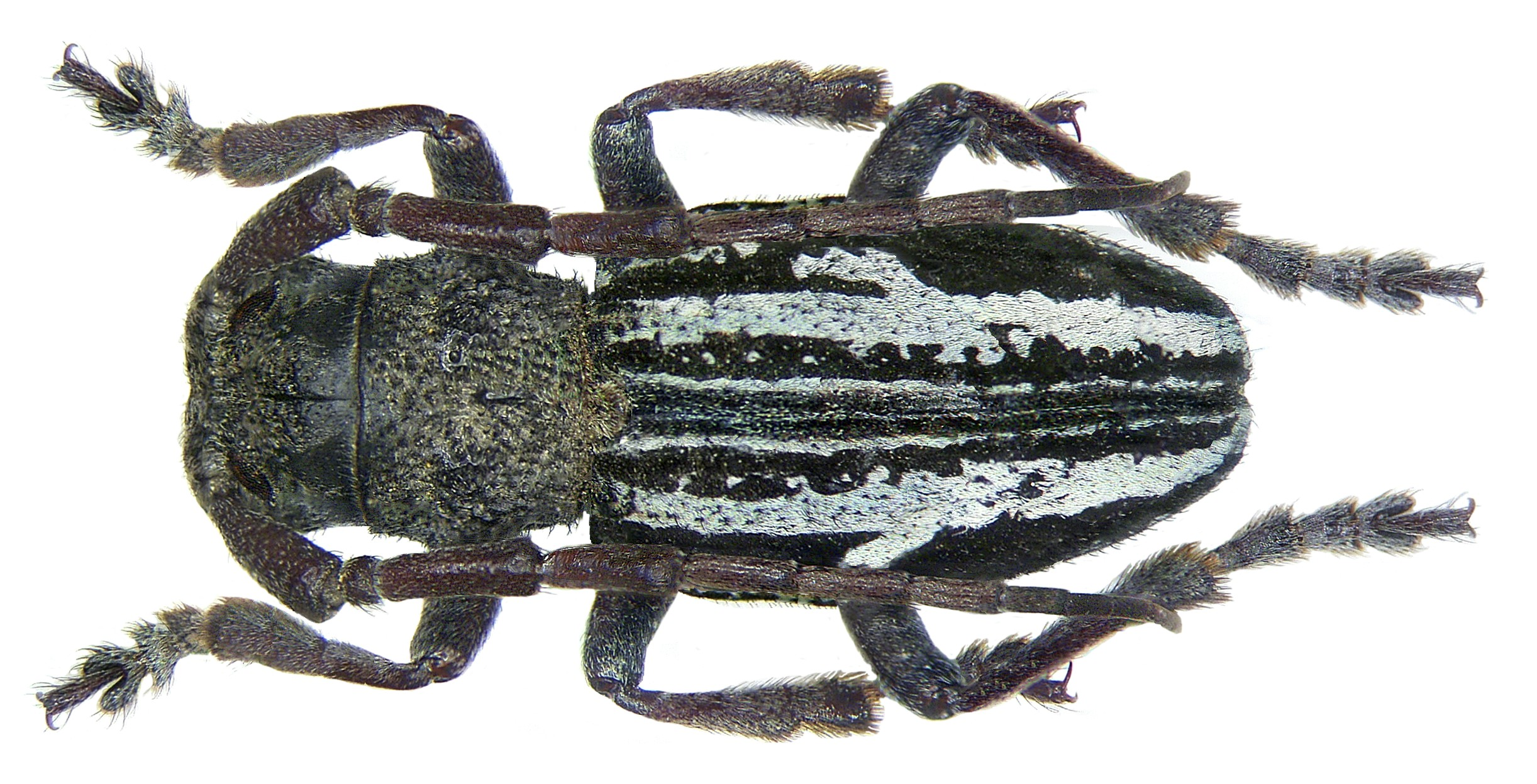
- Trichodorcadion gardneri

Scientific classification
- Kingdom: Animalia
- Phylum: Arthropoda
- Class: Insecta
- Order: Coleoptera
- Suborder: Polyphaga
- Infraorder: Cucujiformia
- Family: Cerambycidae
- Tribe: Dorcadiini
- Genus: Trichodorcadion

= Trichodorcadion =

Genus of beetles

Trichodorcadion is a genus of longhorn beetles of the subfamily Lamiinae, containing the following species:

- Trichodorcadion dubiosum Breuning, 1954
- Trichodorcadion gardneri Breuning, 1942
