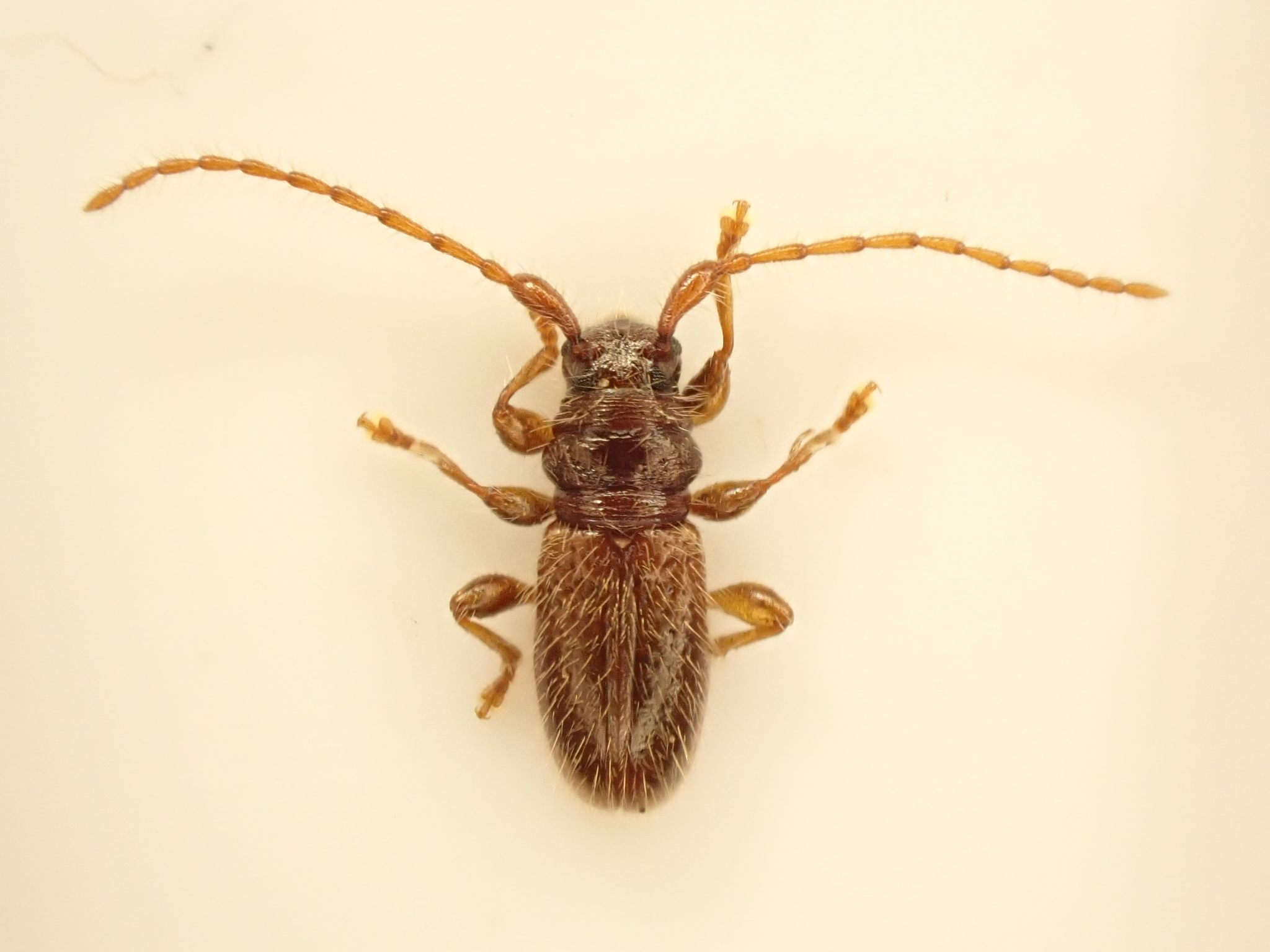

Scientific classification
- Kingdom: Animalia
- Phylum: Arthropoda
- Clade: Pancrustacea
- Class: Insecta
- Order: Coleoptera
- Suborder: Polyphaga
- Infraorder: Cucujiformia
- Family: Cerambycidae
- Genus: Microlamia
- Species: M. pygmaea

Binomial name
- Microlamia pygmaea Bates, 1874

= Microlamia pygmaea =

Species of beetle

Microlamia pygmaea is a species of longhorn beetle that belongs to the subfamily Lamiinae (flat-faced longhorns). This species can be found in Australia and New Zealand.

It was described by Bates in 1874.
