= Microlamia elongata =

Scientific classification
- Kingdom: Animalia
- Phylum: Arthropoda
- Clade: Pancrustacea
- Class: Insecta
- Order: Coleoptera
- Suborder: Polyphaga
- Infraorder: Cucujiformia
- Family: Cerambycidae
- Genus: Microlamia
- Species: M. elongata

Binomial name
- Microlamia elongata Breuning, 1940

Species of beetle

Microlamia elongata is a species of beetle that belongs to the family Cerambycidae.

It was described by Stephan von Breuning in 1940.
