= Microlamia norfolkensis =

Scientific classification
- Kingdom: Animalia
- Phylum: Arthropoda
- Clade: Pancrustacea
- Class: Insecta
- Order: Coleoptera
- Suborder: Polyphaga
- Infraorder: Cucujiformia
- Family: Cerambycidae
- Genus: Microlamia
- Species: M. norfolkensis

Binomial name
- Microlamia norfolkensis Breuning, 1947

Species of beetle

Microlamia norfolkensis is a species of beetle that belongs to the family Cerambycidae (longhorn beetles).

It was described by Stephan von Breuning in 1947.
