= Neodorcadion exornatum =

Scientific classification
- Kingdom: Animalia
- Phylum: Arthropoda
- Class: Insecta
- Order: Coleoptera
- Suborder: Polyphaga
- Infraorder: Cucujiformia
- Family: Cerambycidae
- Genus: Neodorcadion
- Species: N. exornatum

Binomial name
- Neodorcadion exornatum (Frivaldsky, 1835)

Synonyms
- Dorcadion exornatum Frivaldsky, 1835; Dorcadion labyrinthicum Thomson, 1865

Species of beetle

Neodorcadion exornatum is a species of beetle in the family Cerambycidae. It was described by Frivaldsky in 1835. It is known from Romania, Greece, Bulgaria, and Turkey. It contains the varietas Neodorcadion exornatum var. balcanicum.
