= Neodorcadion pelleti =

Scientific classification
- Kingdom: Animalia
- Phylum: Arthropoda
- Class: Insecta
- Order: Coleoptera
- Suborder: Polyphaga
- Infraorder: Cucujiformia
- Family: Cerambycidae
- Genus: Neodorcadion
- Species: N. pelleti

Binomial name
- Neodorcadion pelleti (Mulsant & Rey, 1863)

Synonyms
- Dorcadion pelleti Mulsant & Rey, 1863; Dorcadion segne Mulsant & Rey, 1863

Species of beetle

Neodorcadion pelleti is a species of beetle in the family Cerambycidae. It was described by Mulsant and Rey in 1863. It is known from Turkey. It contains the varietas Neodorcadion pelleti var. disjunctum.
