= Microlamia viridis =

Scientific classification
- Kingdom: Animalia
- Phylum: Arthropoda
- Clade: Pancrustacea
- Class: Insecta
- Order: Coleoptera
- Suborder: Polyphaga
- Infraorder: Cucujiformia
- Family: Cerambycidae
- Genus: Microlamia
- Species: M. viridis

Binomial name
- Microlamia viridis Slipinski & Escalona, 2013

Species of beetle

Microlamia viridis is a species of beetle that belongs to the family Cerambycidae.

It was described by Slipinski & Escalona in 2013.
