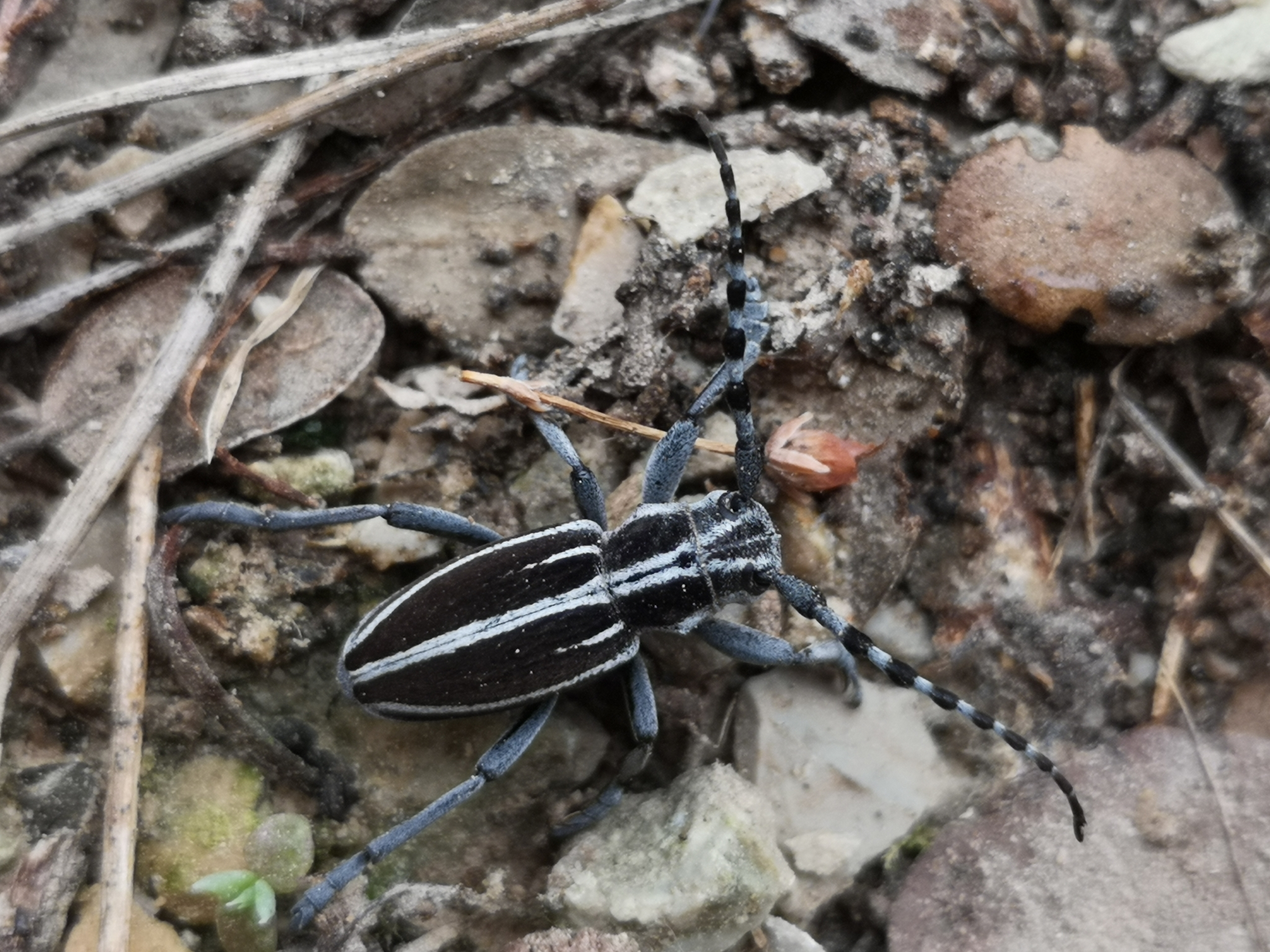
- Iberodorcadion molitor, Spain

Scientific classification
- Kingdom: Animalia
- Phylum: Arthropoda
- Clade: Pancrustacea
- Class: Insecta
- Order: Coleoptera
- Suborder: Polyphaga
- Infraorder: Cucujiformia
- Family: Cerambycidae
- Tribe: Dorcadiini
- Genus: Iberodorcadion
- Species: I. molitor

Binomial name
- Iberodorcadion molitor (Fabricius, 1775)

Synonyms
- Dorcadion molitor (Fabricius, 1775); Dorcadion donzeli Mulsant, 1853; Dorcadion lineola Mulsant, 1853; Lamia molitor Fabricius, 1775

= Iberodorcadion molitor =

Species of beetle

Iberodorcadion molitor is a species of longhorned beetle in the family Cerambycidae. It is found in France, Spain. This species has a single subspecies, Iberodorcadion molitor navasi.
