= Corestheta =

Scientific classification
- Kingdom: Animalia
- Phylum: Arthropoda
- Class: Insecta
- Order: Coleoptera
- Suborder: Polyphaga
- Infraorder: Cucujiformia
- Family: Cerambycidae
- Tribe: Dorcadiini
- Genus: Corestheta; Pascoe, 1875

Genus of beetles

Corestheta is a genus of longhorn beetles of the subfamily Lamiinae, containing the following species:

- Corestheta alternata Carter, 1929
- Corestheta elongata (Broun, 1883)
- Corestheta insularis Pascoe, 1875
- Corestheta minima Breuning, 1958
