= Parmenomorpha =

Scientific classification
- Kingdom: Animalia
- Phylum: Arthropoda
- Class: Insecta
- Order: Coleoptera
- Suborder: Polyphaga
- Infraorder: Cucujiformia
- Family: Cerambycidae
- Tribe: Dorcadiini
- Genus: Parmenomorpha

Genus of beetles

Parmenomorpha is a genus of longhorn beetles of the subfamily Lamiinae, containing the following species:

- Parmenomorpha irregularis Blackburn, 1899
- Parmenomorpha medioplagiata Breuning, 1950
- Parmenomorpha wasselli Carter, 1932
