= Neodorcadion calabricum =

Scientific classification
- Kingdom: Animalia
- Phylum: Arthropoda
- Class: Insecta
- Order: Coleoptera
- Suborder: Polyphaga
- Infraorder: Cucujiformia
- Family: Cerambycidae
- Genus: Neodorcadion
- Species: N. calabricum

Binomial name
- Neodorcadion calabricum (Reitter, 1889)

Species of beetle

Neodorcadion calabricum is a species of beetle in the family Cerambycidae. It was described by Reitter in 1889. It is known from Italy.
