= Neodorcadion exornatoides =

Scientific classification
- Kingdom: Animalia
- Phylum: Arthropoda
- Class: Insecta
- Order: Coleoptera
- Suborder: Polyphaga
- Infraorder: Cucujiformia
- Family: Cerambycidae
- Genus: Neodorcadion
- Species: N. exornatoides

Binomial name
- Neodorcadion exornatoides Breuning, 1962

Species of beetle

Neodorcadion exornatoides is a species of beetle in the family Cerambycidae. It was described by Stephan von Breuning in 1962. It is known from Turkey.
