= Neodorcadion laqueatum =

Scientific classification
- Kingdom: Animalia
- Phylum: Arthropoda
- Class: Insecta
- Order: Coleoptera
- Suborder: Polyphaga
- Infraorder: Cucujiformia
- Family: Cerambycidae
- Genus: Neodorcadion
- Species: N. laqueatum

Binomial name
- Neodorcadion laqueatum (Waltl, 1838)

Synonyms
- Dorcadion interruptum Mulsant & Rey, 1863; Dorcadion laqueatum Waltl, 1838; Dorcadion sparsum Mulsant & Rey, 1863

Species of beetle

Neodorcadion laqueatum is a species of beetle in the family Cerambycidae. It was described by Waltl in 1838. It is known from Bulgaria and Turkey.
