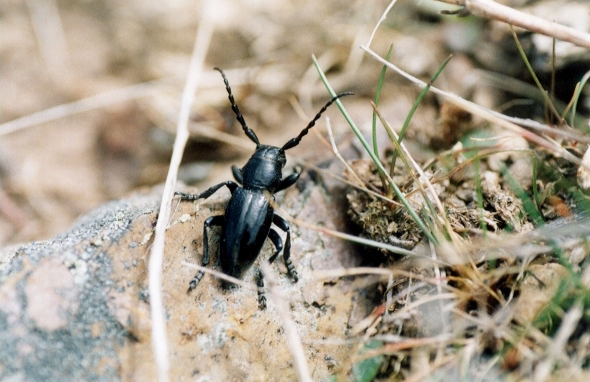

Scientific classification
- Kingdom: Animalia
- Phylum: Arthropoda
- Clade: Pancrustacea
- Class: Insecta
- Order: Coleoptera
- Suborder: Polyphaga
- Infraorder: Cucujiformia
- Family: Cerambycidae
- Genus: Iberodorcadion
- Species: I. amorii

Binomial name
- Iberodorcadion amorii (Marseul, 1856)

Synonyms
- Doreadion amorii Marseul, 1856; Dorcadion amorii (Marseul, 1856)

= Iberodorcadion amorii =

Species of beetle

Iberodorcadion amorii is a species of beetle in the family Cerambycidae. It was described by Sylvain Auguste de Marseul in 1856. It is known from Spain. It is named for Fernando Amor y Mayor.

Iberodorcadion amorii measure 9.5–14.5 mm (0.37–0.57 in) in length.

== Subspecies ==
There are two subspecies:

- Iberodorcadion amorii amorii (Marseul, 1856)
- Iberodorcadion amorii segurense Escalera, 1911
