= Parmenomorpha medioplagiata =

Scientific classification
- Kingdom: Animalia
- Phylum: Arthropoda
- Class: Insecta
- Order: Coleoptera
- Suborder: Polyphaga
- Infraorder: Cucujiformia
- Family: Cerambycidae
- Genus: Parmenomorpha
- Species: P. medioplagiata

Binomial name
- Parmenomorpha medioplagiata Breuning, 1950

Species of beetle

Parmenomorpha medioplagiata is a species of beetle in the family Cerambycidae. It was described by Stephan von Breuning in 1950. It is known from Australia.
