= Oricopis intercoxalis =

Scientific classification
- Domain: Eukaryota
- Kingdom: Animalia
- Phylum: Arthropoda
- Class: Insecta
- Order: Coleoptera
- Suborder: Polyphaga
- Infraorder: Cucujiformia
- Family: Cerambycidae
- Genus: Oricopis
- Species: O. intercoxalis

Binomial name
- Oricopis intercoxalis Lea, 1917

Species of beetle

Oricopis intercoxalis is a species of beetle in the family Cerambycidae. It was described by Lea in 1917. It is known from Australia.
