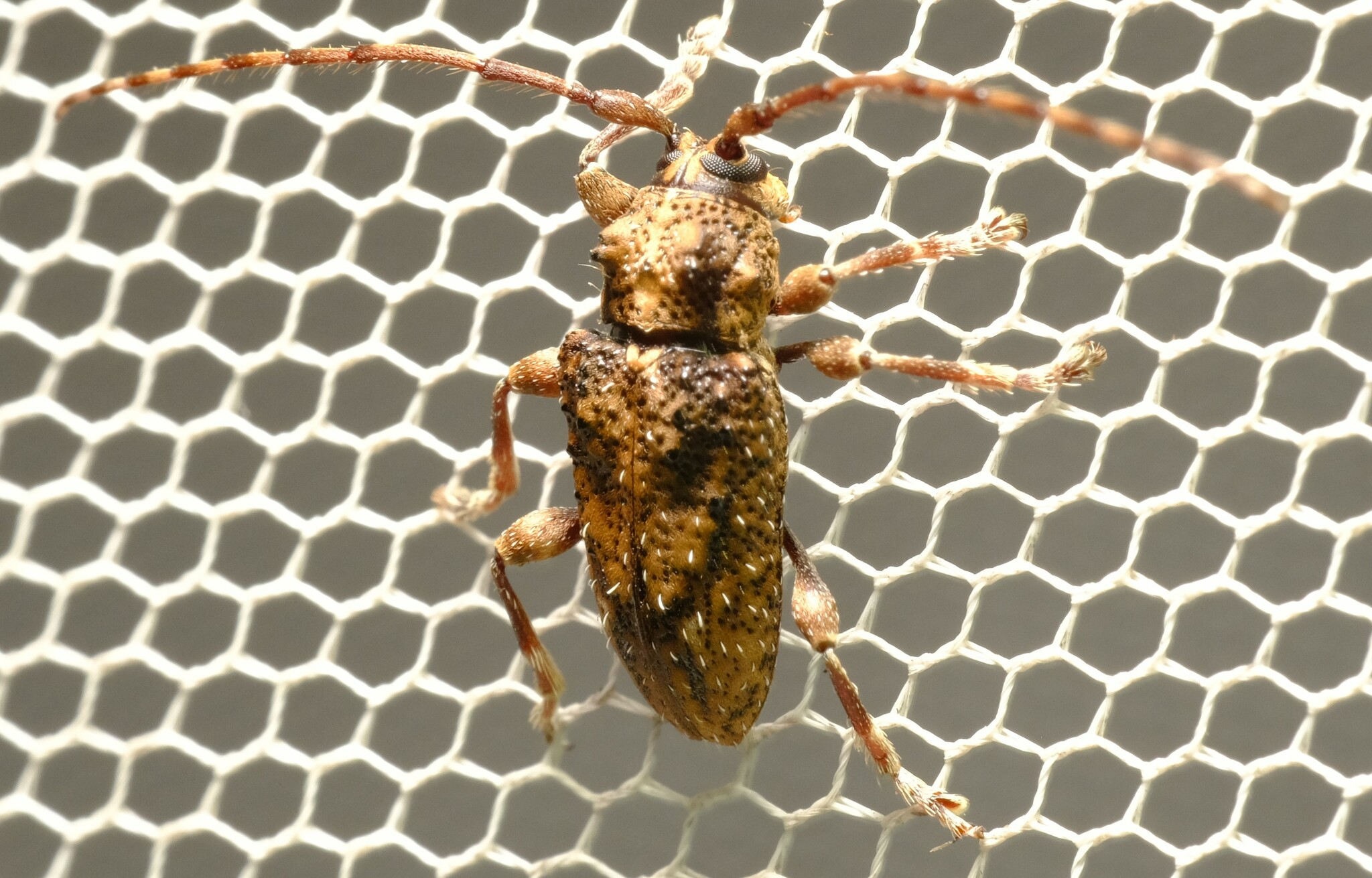

Scientific classification
- Domain: Eukaryota
- Kingdom: Animalia
- Phylum: Arthropoda
- Class: Insecta
- Order: Coleoptera
- Suborder: Polyphaga
- Infraorder: Cucujiformia
- Family: Cerambycidae
- Genus: Oricopis
- Species: O. umbrosus

Binomial name
- Oricopis umbrosus Pascoe, 1863

= Oricopis umbrosus =

Species of beetle

Oricopis umbrosus is a species of beetle in the family Cerambycidae. It was described by Francis Polkinghorne Pascoe in 1863. It is known from Australia.
