= Corestheta elongata =

Scientific classification
- Kingdom: Animalia
- Phylum: Arthropoda
- Class: Insecta
- Order: Coleoptera
- Suborder: Polyphaga
- Infraorder: Cucujiformia
- Family: Cerambycidae
- Genus: Corestheta
- Species: C. elongata

Binomial name
- Corestheta elongata (Broun, 1883)

Synonyms
- Somatidia elongata Broun, 1883

Species of beetle

Corestheta elongata is a species of beetle in the family Cerambycidae. It was described by Broun in 1883, originally under the genus Somatidia. It is known from New Zealand.
