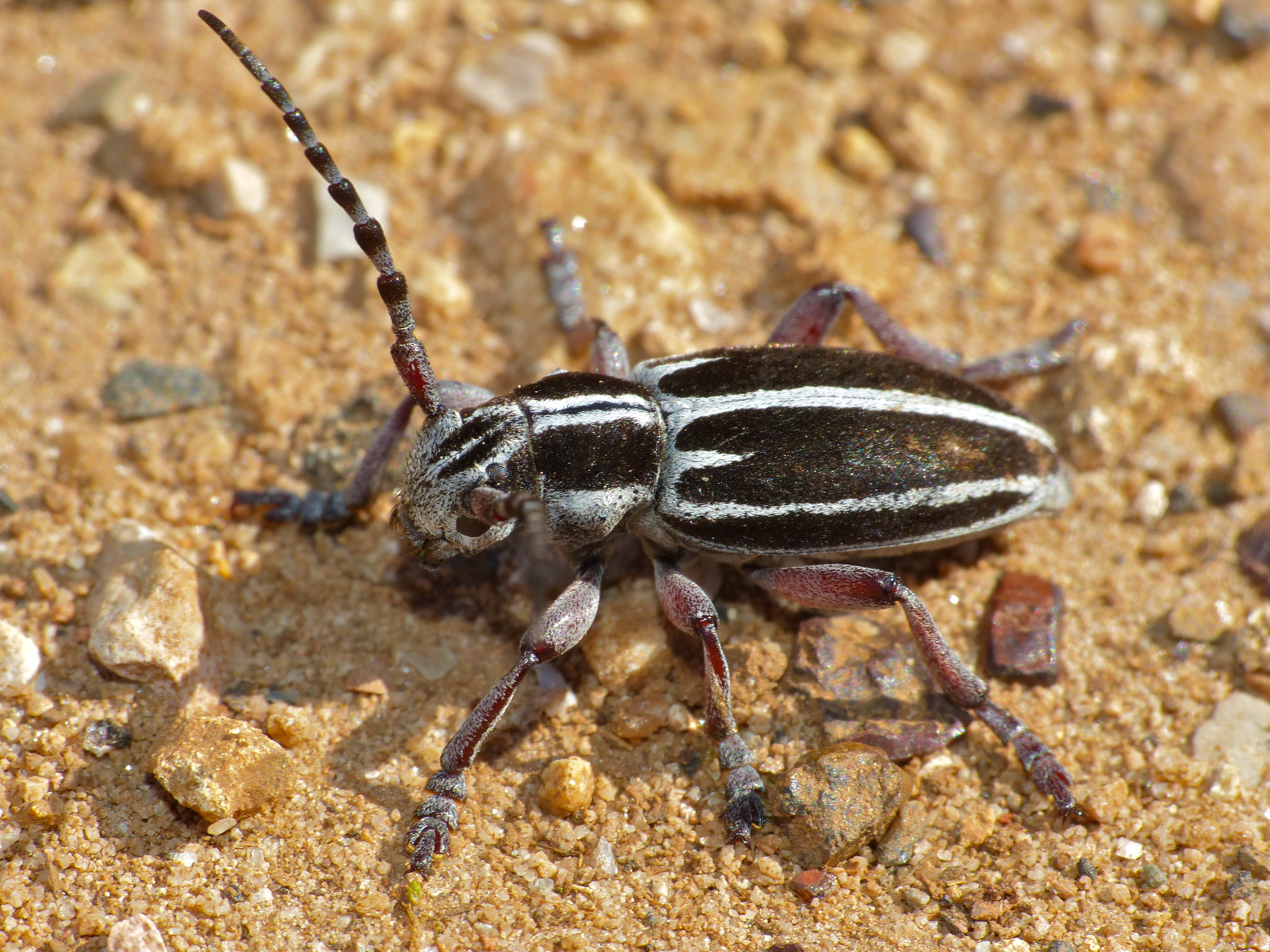

Scientific classification
- Kingdom: Animalia
- Phylum: Arthropoda
- Clade: Pancrustacea
- Class: Insecta
- Order: Coleoptera
- Suborder: Polyphaga
- Infraorder: Cucujiformia
- Family: Cerambycidae
- Genus: Iberodorcadion
- Species: I. fuliginator

Binomial name
- Iberodorcadion fuliginator (Linné, 1758)

Synonyms
- Dorcadion fuliginator (Linnaeus, 1758); Cerambyx fasciatus Geoffroy, 1785 nec Scopoli, 1763; Cerambyx fuliginator Linnaeus, 1758; Cerambyx melano-leucos Voet, 1778

= Iberodorcadion fuliginator =

Species of beetle

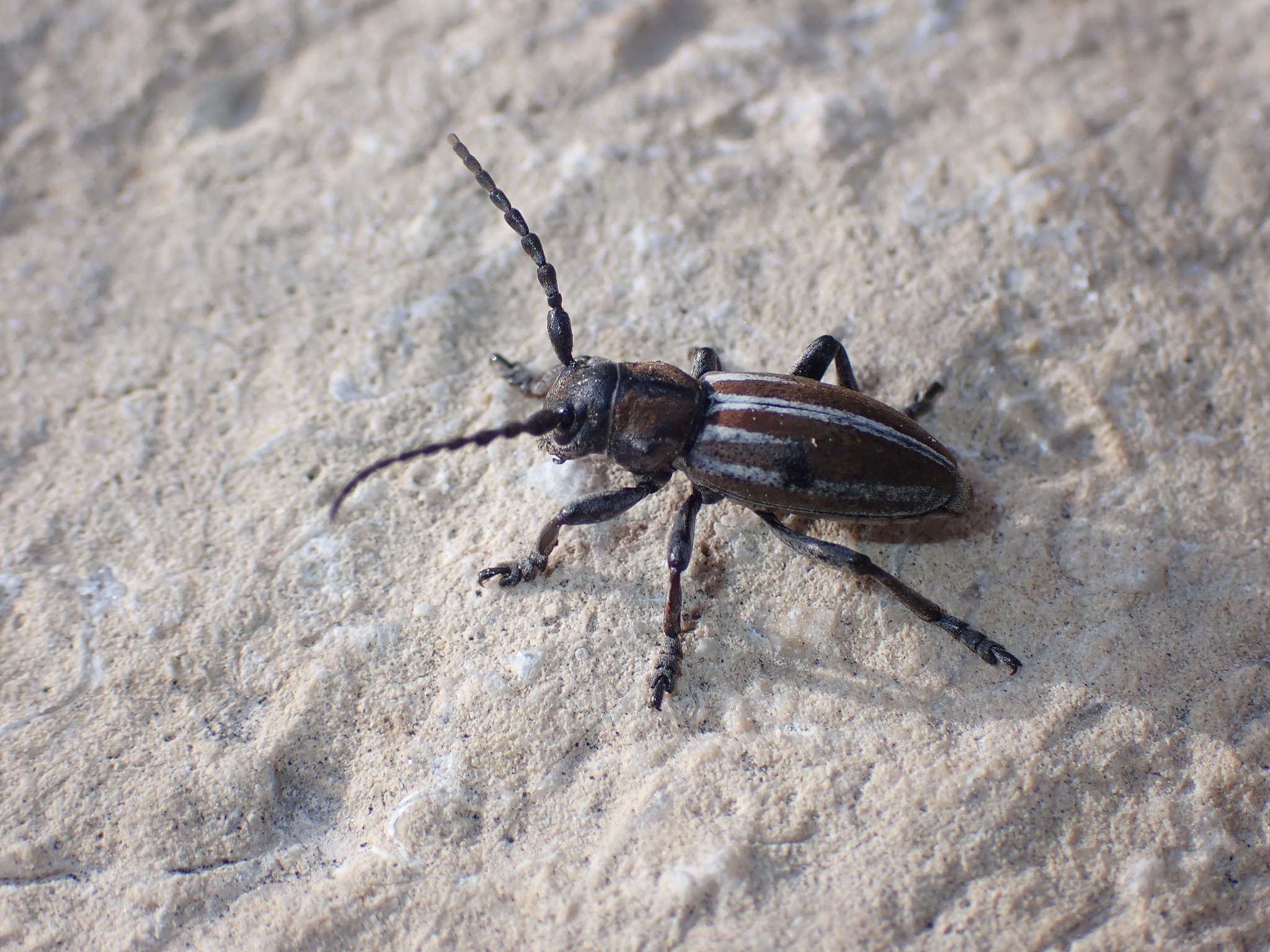
Iberodorcadion fuliginator, France

Iberodorcadion fuliginator is a species of beetle in the family Cerambycidae. It was described by Carl Linnaeus in his landmark 1758 10th edition of Systema Naturae. It is known from Central Europe: Spain, Belgium, Luxembourg (from where it is considered to be extirpated), Netherlands, Portugal, France, Germany, Austria, Lithuania, and Switzerland.

Iberodorcadion fuliginator is a flightless beetle that feeds on grass. Its range extends from the Iberian Peninsula through Central Europe to Poland and from the southern Netherlands to northern Switzerland. It is highly endangered.

The beetle has a 2-year life cycle. In the spring, eggs are deposited in stems of grass such as Bromus erectus, their main larval host. The larvae hatch in May or June, feed on grass roots, and pupate after winter hibernation. Adults emerge from the pupae in July or August, but remain in the soil until the end of their second winter hibernation. They emerge from the soil in the spring and are sexually active for about a month.

Iberodorcadion has sometimes been considered a subgenus of the genus Dorcadion, resulting in the name Dorcadion fuliginator for this species.
