= Iberodorcadion paulae =

Scientific classification
- Kingdom: Animalia
- Phylum: Arthropoda
- Class: Insecta
- Order: Coleoptera
- Suborder: Polyphaga
- Infraorder: Cucujiformia
- Family: Cerambycidae
- Genus: Iberodorcadion
- Species: I. paulae

Binomial name
- Iberodorcadion paulae Corraleño & Murria, 2012

Synonyms
- Dorcadion paulae (Corraleño & Murria, 2012)

Species of beetle

Iberodorcadion paulae is a species of beetle in the family Cerambycidae. It was described in 2012. It is known from Spain with records from the province of Zaragoza.

Iberodorcadion paulae measure 10.5–16 mm (0.41–0.63 in) in length.
