= Parmenomorpha irregularis =

Scientific classification
- Kingdom: Animalia
- Phylum: Arthropoda
- Class: Insecta
- Order: Coleoptera
- Suborder: Polyphaga
- Infraorder: Cucujiformia
- Family: Cerambycidae
- Genus: Parmenomorpha
- Species: P. irregularis

Binomial name
- Parmenomorpha irregularis Blackburn, 1899

Species of beetle

Parmenomorpha irregularis is a species of beetle in the family Cerambycidae. It was described by Blackburn in 1899. It is known from Australia.
