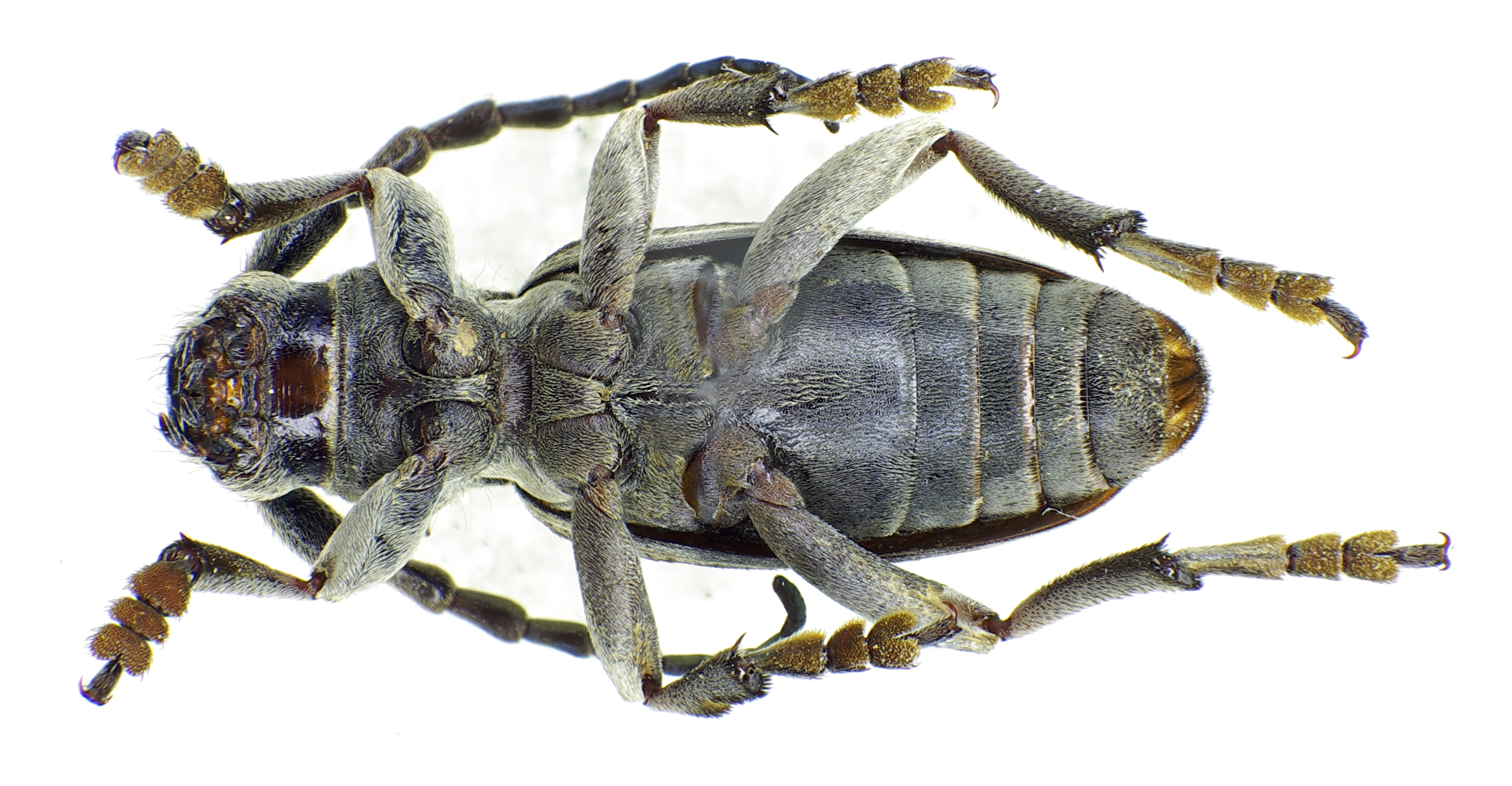
- Neodorcadion bilineatum

Scientific classification
- Kingdom: Animalia
- Phylum: Arthropoda
- Class: Insecta
- Order: Coleoptera
- Suborder: Polyphaga
- Infraorder: Cucujiformia
- Family: Cerambycidae
- Tribe: Dorcadiini
- Genus: Neodorcadion; Ganglbauer, 1884

= Neodorcadion =

Genus of beetles

Neodorcadion is a genus of longhorn beetles of the subfamily Lamiinae, containing the following species:

- Neodorcadion bilineatum (Germar, 1824)
- Neodorcadion calabricum (Reitter, 1889)
- Neodorcadion exornatoides Breuning, 1962
- Neodorcadion exornatum (Frivaldsky, 1835)
- Neodorcadion fallax (Kraatz, 1873)
- Neodorcadion laqueatum (Waltl, 1838)
- Neodorcadion orientale Ganglbauer, 1883
- Neodorcadion pelleti (Mulsant & Rey, 1863)
- Neodorcadion virleti (Brullé, 1833)
