= Iberodorcadion mus =

Scientific classification
- Kingdom: Animalia
- Phylum: Arthropoda
- Clade: Pancrustacea
- Class: Insecta
- Order: Coleoptera
- Suborder: Polyphaga
- Infraorder: Cucujiformia
- Family: Cerambycidae
- Tribe: Dorcadiini
- Genus: Iberodorcadion
- Species: I. mus

Binomial name
- Iberodorcadion mus (Rosenhauer, 1856)

Synonyms
- Dorcadion mus Rosenhauer, 1856; Dorcadion andalusiacum Breuning, 1962; Dorcadion escalerai Pic, 1900; Dorcadion grisescens Escalera, 1900; Dorcadion quadrifuscovittatum Breuning, 1958; Dorcadion rondae Flach, 1907; Iberodorcadion andalusiacum (Breuning, 1962); Iberodorcadion grisescens (Escalera) Vives, 1983

Species of beetle

Iberodorcadion mus is a species of longhorned beetle in the family Cerambycidae. It is found in Spain.
