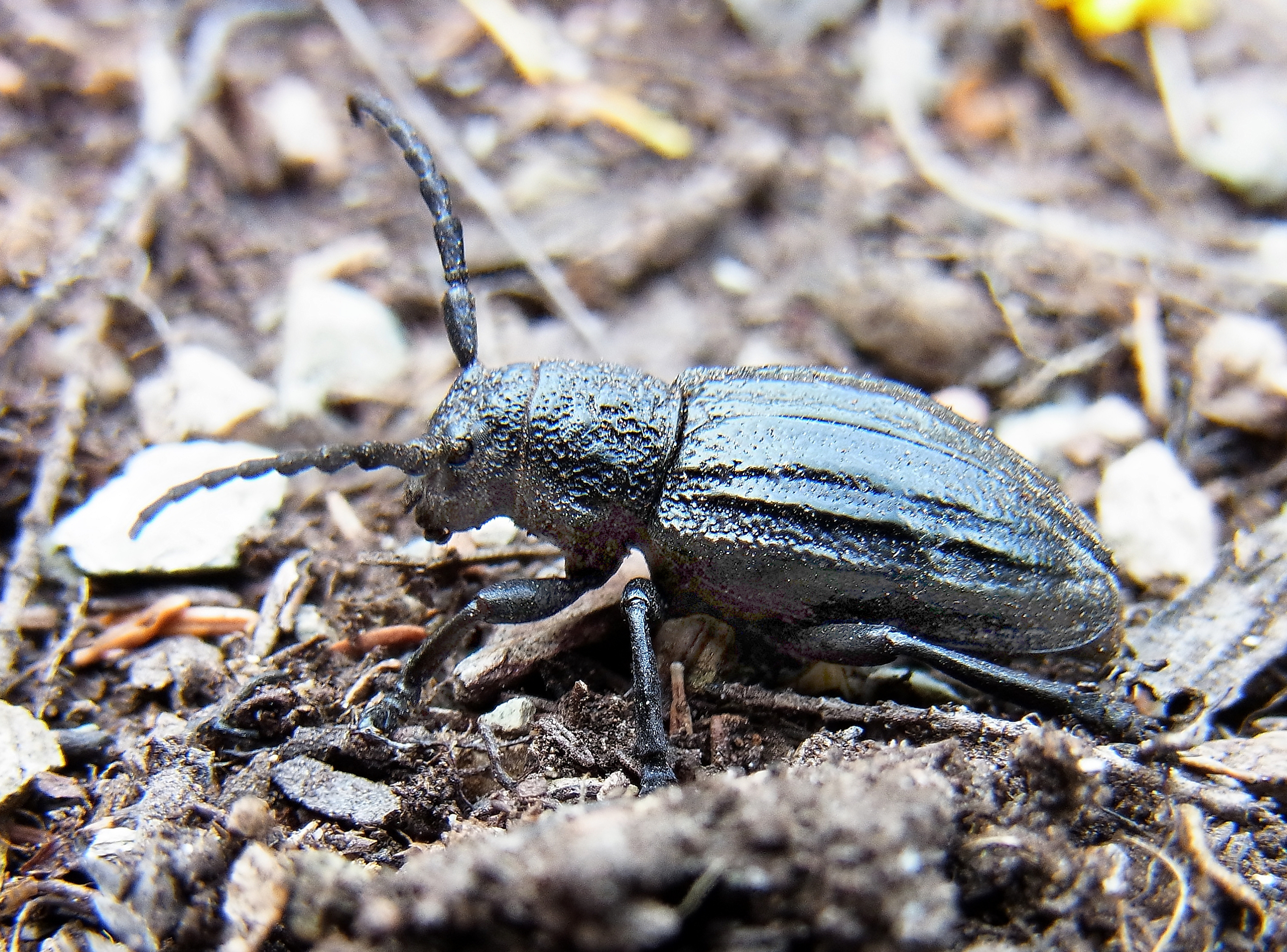
- Iberodorcadion seoanei, Spain

Scientific classification
- Kingdom: Animalia
- Phylum: Arthropoda
- Class: Insecta
- Order: Coleoptera
- Suborder: Polyphaga
- Infraorder: Cucujiformia
- Family: Cerambycidae
- Tribe: Dorcadiini
- Genus: Iberodorcadion; Breuning, 1943

Subgenera
- Baeticodorcadion; Hispanodorcadion

= Iberodorcadion =

Genus of beetles

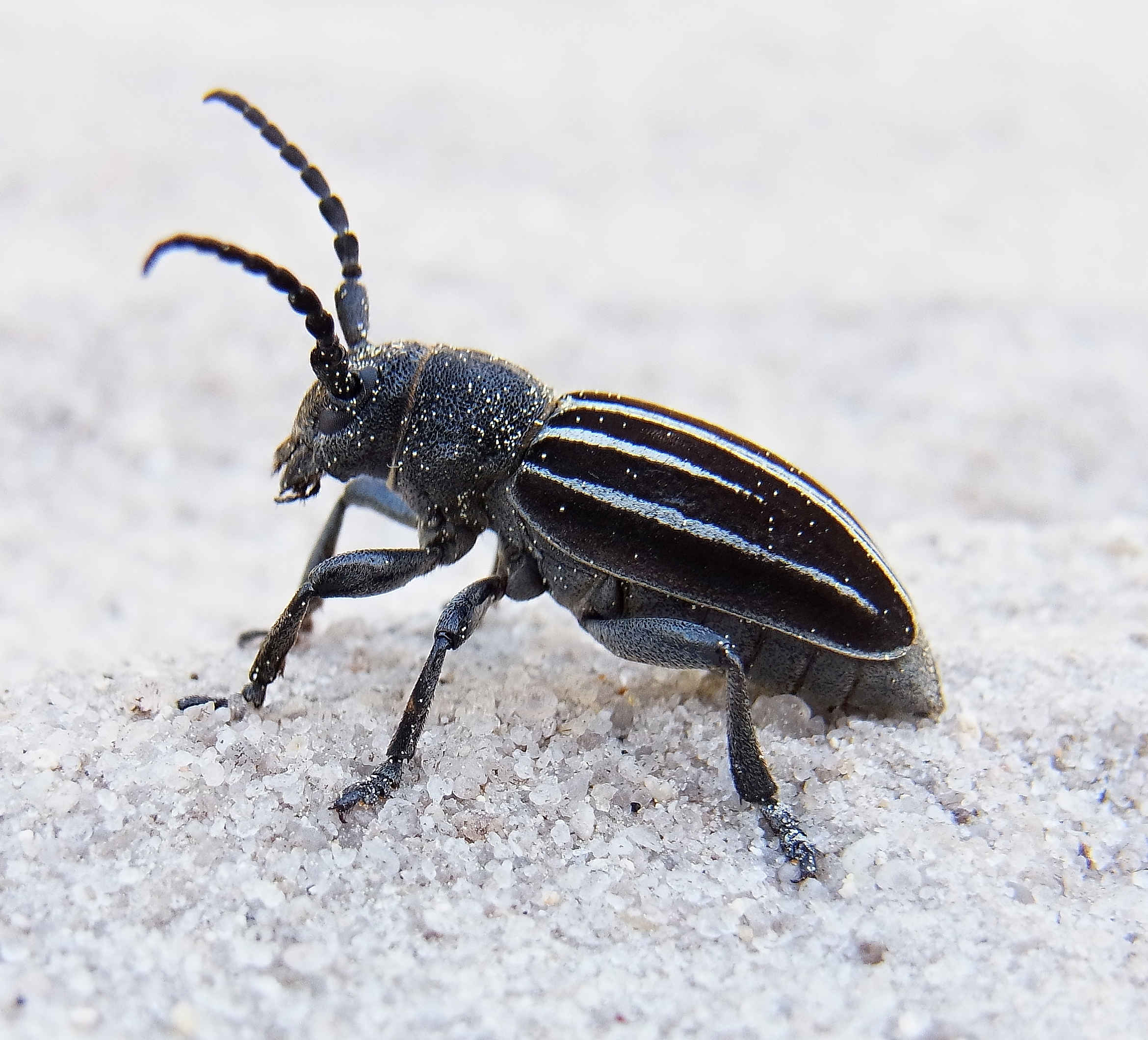
Iberodorcadion fuliginator, France

Iberodorcadion is a genus of longhorned beetles in the family Cerambycidae, found in Europe. There are more than 40 described species in Iberodorcadion.

Iberodorcadion was formerly considered a subgenus of the genus Dorcadion, and the species listed below were named, for example, Dorcadion abulense instead of Iberodorcadion abulense.

== Species ==
These 48 species belong to the genus Iberodorcadion:

- Iberodorcadion abulense (Lauffer, 1902) (Spain)
- Iberodorcadion aguadoi Aguado & Tomé, 2000 (Spain)
- Iberodorcadion albicans (Chevrolat, 1862) (Spain)
- Iberodorcadion almarzense (Escalera, 1902) (Spain)
- Iberodorcadion amorii (Marseul, 1856) (Spain)
- Iberodorcadion aries Tomé & Berger, 1999 (Spain)
- Iberodorcadion atlantis (Bedel, 1921) (Morocco)
- Iberodorcadion becerrae (Lauffer, 1901) (Spain)
- Iberodorcadion bolivari (Lauffer, 1898) (Spain)
- Iberodorcadion brannani (Schaufuß, 1870) (Portugal)
- Iberodorcadion castilianum (Chevrolat, 1862) (Spain)
- Iberodorcadion circumcinctum (Chevrolat, 1862) (Spain)
- Iberodorcadion coelloi Verdugo, 1996 (Spain)
- Iberodorcadion demandense (Escalera, 1902) (Spain)
- Iberodorcadion ferdinandi (Escalera, 1900) (Spain)
- Iberodorcadion fuentei (Pic, 1899) (Spain)
- Iberodorcadion fuliginator (Linné, 1758) (Europe)
- Iberodorcadion ghilianii (Chevrolat, 1862) (Spain)
- Iberodorcadion graellsii (Graëlls, 1858) (Spain)
- Iberodorcadion grustani González, 1992 (Spain)
- Iberodorcadion heydenii (Kraatz, 1870) (Spain)
- Iberodorcadion isernii (Pérez-Arcas, 1868) (Spain)
- Iberodorcadion korbi (Ganglbauer, 1884) (Spain)
- Iberodorcadion lorquinii (Fairmaire, 1855) (Spain)
- Iberodorcadion lusitanicum (Chevrolat, 1840) (Portugal, Spain)
- Iberodorcadion marinae Tomé & Bahíllo, 1996 (Spain)
- Iberodorcadion marmottani (Escalera, 1900) (Spain)
- Iberodorcadion martinezii (Pérez-Arcas, 1874) (Spain)
- Iberodorcadion mimomucidum (Breuning, 1976) (Portugal)
- Iberodorcadion molitor (Fabricius, 1775) (France, Spain)
- Iberodorcadion mosqueruelense (Escalera, 1902) (Spain)
- Iberodorcadion mucidum (Dalman, 1817) (Spain)
- Iberodorcadion mus (Rosenhauer, 1856) (Spain)
- Iberodorcadion neilense (Escalera, 1902) (Spain)
- Iberodorcadion nudipenne (Escalera, 1908) (Spain)
- Iberodorcadion paulae Corraleño & Murria, 2012 (Spain)
- Iberodorcadion perezi (Graëlls, 1849) (Spain)
- Iberodorcadion pseudomolitor (Escalera, 1902) (Spain)
- Iberodorcadion segovianum (Chevrolat, 1862) (Spain)
- Iberodorcadion seguntianum (K. Daniel & J. Daniel, 1898) (Spain)
- Iberodorcadion seoanei (Graëlls, 1858) (Spain)
- Iberodorcadion spinolae (Dalman, 1817) (Spain)
- Iberodorcadion suturale (Chevrolat, 1862) (Spain)
- Iberodorcadion terolense (Escalera, 1902) (Spain)
- Iberodorcadion uhagonii (Pérez-Arcas, 1868) (Spain)
- Iberodorcadion vanhoegaerdeni (Breuning, 1956) (Spain)
- Iberodorcadion zarcoi (Schramm, 1910) (Spain)
- Iberodorcadion zenete Anichtchenko & Verdugo, 2004 (Spain)
