= Oricopis =

Scientific classification
- Domain: Eukaryota
- Kingdom: Animalia
- Phylum: Arthropoda
- Class: Insecta
- Order: Coleoptera
- Suborder: Polyphaga
- Infraorder: Cucujiformia
- Family: Cerambycidae
- Subfamily: Lamiinae
- Tribe: Desmiphorini
- Genus: Oricopis; Pascoe, 1863

Synonyms
- Elasmostoma Olliff, 1890; Mimoricopis Breuning, 1969; Elasmotena McKeown, 1945; Cristhybolasius Breuning, 1959

Genus of beetles

Oricopis is a genus of longhorn beetles of the subfamily Lamiinae.

== Species ==
Oricopis contains the following species:

- Oricopis flavolineatus Breuning, 1939
- Oricopis guttatus Blackburn, 1894
- Oricopis insulana (Olliff, 1890)
- Oricopis intercoxalis Lea, 1917
- Oricopis maculiventris Lea, 1917
- Oricopis mediofasciatus (Breuning, 1959)
- Oricopis rufescens (Breuning, 1969)
- Oricopis setipennis Lea, 1917
- Oricopis umbrosus Pascoe, 1863
