= Oricopis insulana =

Scientific classification
- Domain: Eukaryota
- Kingdom: Animalia
- Phylum: Arthropoda
- Class: Insecta
- Order: Coleoptera
- Suborder: Polyphaga
- Infraorder: Cucujiformia
- Family: Cerambycidae
- Genus: Oricopis
- Species: O. insulana

Binomial name
- Oricopis insulana (Olliff, 1890)

Species of beetle

Oricopis insulana is a species of beetle in the family Cerambycidae. It was described by Arthur Sidney Olliff in 1890.
