= Paraxylotoles =

Scientific classification
- Kingdom: Animalia
- Phylum: Arthropoda
- Class: Insecta
- Order: Coleoptera
- Suborder: Polyphaga
- Infraorder: Cucujiformia
- Family: Cerambycidae
- Genus: Paraxylotoles
- Species: P. setipennis

Binomial name
- Paraxylotoles setipennis Breuning, 1973

Genus of beetles

Paraxylotoles setipennis is a species of beetles in the family Cerambycidae, and the only species in the genus Paraxylotoles. It was described by Breuning in 1973.
