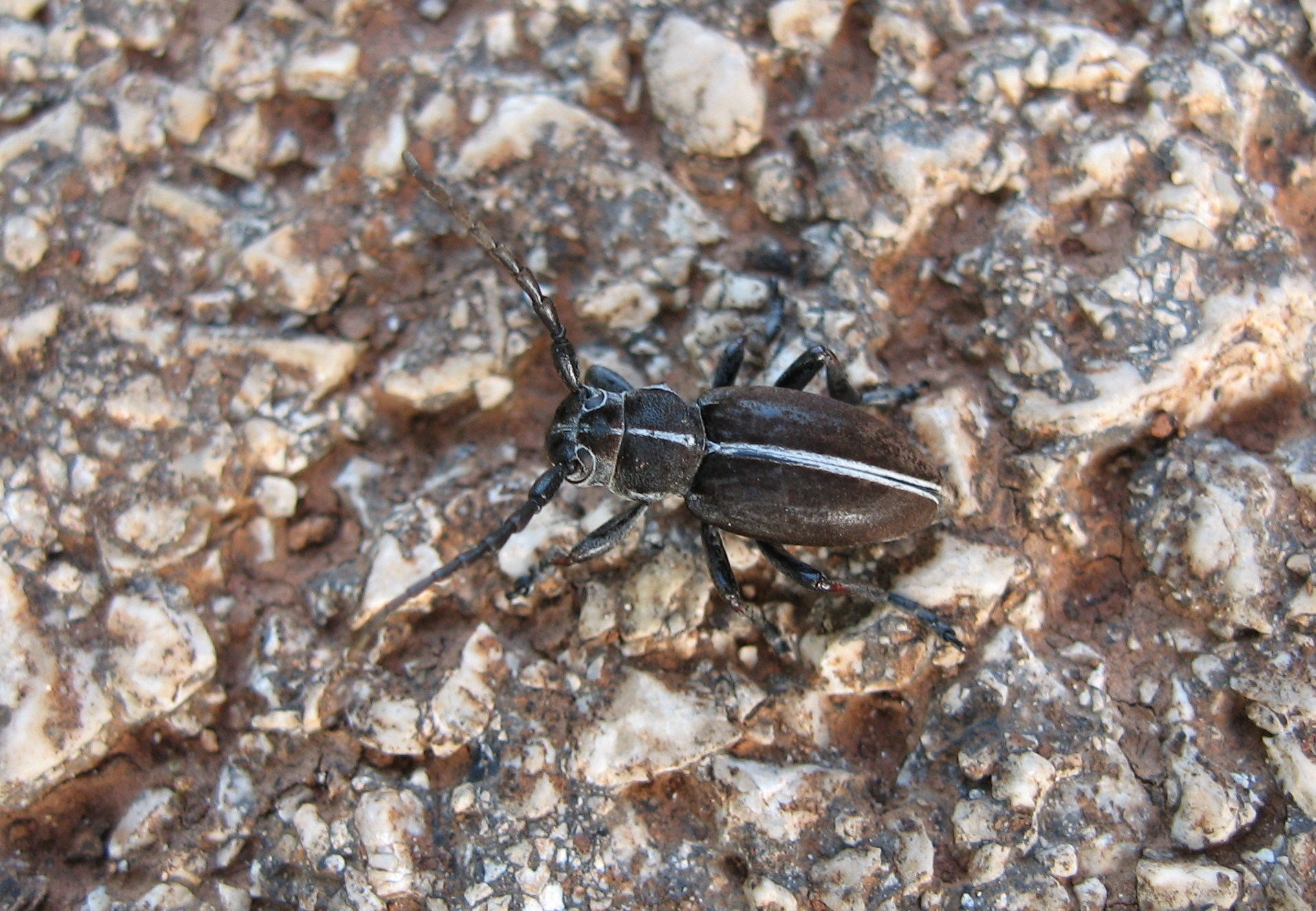
- Dorcadion arenarium

Scientific classification
- Kingdom: Animalia
- Phylum: Arthropoda
- Class: Insecta
- Order: Coleoptera
- Suborder: Polyphaga
- Infraorder: Cucujiformia
- Family: Cerambycidae
- Subfamily: Lamiinae
- Tribe: Dorcadiini; Latreille, 1825

= Dorcadiini =

Tribe of beetles

Dorcadiini is a tribe of longhorn beetles of the subfamily Lamiinae. It was described by Pierre André Latreille in 1825.

== Taxonomy ==
- Corestheta Pascoe, 1875
- Dorcadion Dalman, 1817
- Eodorcadion Breuning, 1946
- Iberodorcadion Breuning, 1943
- Microlamia Bates, 1874
- Neodorcadion Ganglbauer, 1883
- Paraxylotoles Breuning, 1973
- Parmenomorpha Blackburn, 1889
- Trichodorcadion Breuning, 1942
- Xylotoles Newman, 1840

[?] Elasmotena McKeown, 1945 / Oricopis Pascoe, 1863
