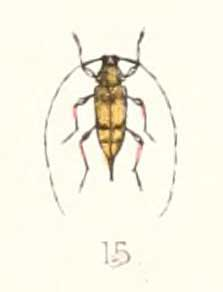
- Jordanoleiopus mocquerysi

Scientific classification
- Kingdom: Animalia
- Phylum: Arthropoda
- Class: Insecta
- Order: Coleoptera
- Suborder: Polyphaga
- Infraorder: Cucujiformia
- Family: Cerambycidae
- Subfamily: Lamiinae
- Tribe: Acanthocinini
- Genus: Jordanoleiopus; Lepesme & Breuning, 1955

= Jordanoleiopus =

Genus of beetle

Jordanoleiopus is a genus of beetles in the family Cerambycidae, containing the following species:

subgenus Jordanoleiopus

- Jordanoleiopus africanus (Jordan, 1894)
- Jordanoleiopus alboscutellaris Breuning, 1977
- Jordanoleiopus binigromaculipennis Breuning, 1977
- Jordanoleiopus catops (Jordan, 1903)
- Jordanoleiopus fenestrella (Jordan, 1903)
- Jordanoleiopus fuscosparsutus Breuning, 1970
- Jordanoleiopus maynei Lepesme & Breuning, 1955
- Jordanoleiopus mocquerysi (Jordan, 1894)
- Jordanoleiopus pantosi Breuning, 1958

subgenus Paraphelileiopus

- Jordanoleiopus hautmanni Breuning, 1956
- Jordanoleiopus paraphelis (Jordan, 1903)

subgenus Polymistoleiopus

- Jordanoleiopus abyssinicus Breuning, 1961
- Jordanoleiopus alboreductus (Lepesme & Breuning, 1953)
- Jordanoleiopus albosuturalis Breuning, 1955
- Jordanoleiopus annae Lazarev & Skrylnik, 2023
- Jordanoleiopus antennalis (Jordan, 1894)
- Jordanoleiopus benjamini Breuning, 1956
- Jordanoleiopus bifuscoplagiatus Báguena & Breuning, 1958
- Jordanoleiopus brunneicolor Breuning, 1969
- Jordanoleiopus conradti (Aurivillius, 1907)
- Jordanoleiopus endroedyi Breuning, 1972
- Jordanoleiopus feai Breuning, 1955
- Jordanoleiopus femoralis Hunt & Breuning, 1957
- Jordanoleiopus flavescens Breuning, 1955
- Jordanoleiopus flavomaculatus Hunt & Breuning, 1957
- Jordanoleiopus flavosignatus Breuning, 1977
- Jordanoleiopus flavosuturalis Breuning, 1958
- Jordanoleiopus fuscomaculatus Breuning, 1957
- Jordanoleiopus fuscosignatipennis Breuning, 1971
- Jordanoleiopus fuscosignatus Breuning, 1964
- Jordanoleiopus gabonensis Breuning, 1977
- Jordanoleiopus gabonicus Breuning, 1958
- Jordanoleiopus gardneri Breuning, 1958
- Jordanoleiopus inmbae Breuning, 1955
- Jordanoleiopus ivorensis Breuning, 1968
- Jordanoleiopus kivuensis Breuning, 1956
- Jordanoleiopus leonensis Breuning, 1957
- Jordanoleiopus machadoi Breuning, 1959
- Jordanoleiopus mirei Breuning, 1977
- Jordanoleiopus monoxenus Breuning, 1977
- Jordanoleiopus multinigromaculatus Breuning, 1977
- Jordanoleiopus niger Breuning, 1969
- Jordanoleiopus orientalis Breuning, 1957
- Jordanoleiopus partesuturalis Breuning, 1956
- Jordanoleiopus polymistus (Distant, 1905)
- Jordanoleiopus quadriflavomaculatus Breuning, 1958
- Jordanoleiopus rufofemoralis Breuning, 1977
- Jordanoleiopus rufofemoratus Breuning, 1958
- Jordanoleiopus rufotibialis Breuning, 1977
- Jordanoleiopus subunicolor Breuning, 1955
- Jordanoleiopus testui Breuning, 1977
- Jordanoleiopus ugandicola Breuning, 1964
- Jordanoleiopus unicolor Breuning, 1956
- Jordanoleiopus villiersi (Lepesme & Breuning, 1953)
- Jordanoleiopus zanzibaricus Breuning, 1967
