= Paraphelileiopus =

Scientific classification
- Kingdom: Animalia
- Phylum: Arthropoda
- Clade: Pancrustacea
- Class: Insecta
- Order: Coleoptera
- Suborder: Polyphaga
- Infraorder: Cucujiformia
- Family: Cerambycidae
- Subfamily: Lamiinae
- Tribe: Acanthocinini
- Genus: Paraphelileiopus; Lepesme & Breuning, 1955

Synonyms
- Jordanoleiopus (Paraphelileiopus) Lepesme & Breuning, 1955

Genus of beetles

Paraphelileiopus is a genus of beetles in the family Cerambycidae, tribe Acanthocinini. It occurs in Central Africa. It was originally described as a subgenus of Jordanoleiopus, and in some sources still treated as such.

Paraphelileiopus measure 6–7.5 mm (0.24–0.30 in) in length.

== Species ==
There are two accepted species:

- Paraphelileiopus hautmanni (Breuning, 1956)
- Paraphelileiopus paraphelis (Jordan, 1903)
