= Jordanoleiopus kivuensis =

Scientific classification
- Kingdom: Animalia
- Phylum: Arthropoda
- Class: Insecta
- Order: Coleoptera
- Suborder: Polyphaga
- Infraorder: Cucujiformia
- Family: Cerambycidae
- Genus: Jordanoleiopus
- Species: J. kivuensis

Binomial name
- Jordanoleiopus kivuensis Breuning, 1956

Species of beetle

Jordanoleiopus kivuensis is a species of beetle in the family Cerambycidae. It was described by Stephan von Breuning in 1956.
