= Jordanoleiopus villiersi =

Scientific classification
- Kingdom: Animalia
- Phylum: Arthropoda
- Class: Insecta
- Order: Coleoptera
- Suborder: Polyphaga
- Infraorder: Cucujiformia
- Family: Cerambycidae
- Genus: Jordanoleiopus
- Species: J. villiersi

Binomial name
- Jordanoleiopus villiersi (Lepesme & Breuning, 1953)

Species of beetle

Jordanoleiopus villiersi is a species of beetle in the family Cerambycidae. It was described by Lepesme and Breuning in 1953.
