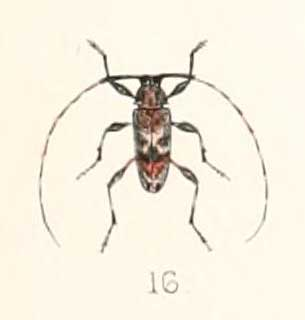

Scientific classification
- Domain: Eukaryota
- Kingdom: Animalia
- Phylum: Arthropoda
- Class: Insecta
- Order: Coleoptera
- Suborder: Polyphaga
- Infraorder: Cucujiformia
- Family: Cerambycidae
- Genus: Jordanoleiopus
- Species: J. africanus

Binomial name
- Jordanoleiopus africanus (Jordan, 1894)

= Jordanoleiopus africanus =

Species of beetle

Jordanoleiopus africanus is a species of beetle in the family Cerambycidae. It was described by Karl Jordan in 1894.
