= Jordanoleiopus fuscosignatus =

Scientific classification
- Kingdom: Animalia
- Phylum: Arthropoda
- Class: Insecta
- Order: Coleoptera
- Suborder: Polyphaga
- Infraorder: Cucujiformia
- Family: Cerambycidae
- Genus: Jordanoleiopus
- Species: J. fuscosignatus

Binomial name
- Jordanoleiopus fuscosignatus Breuning, 1964

Species of beetle

Jordanoleiopus fuscosignatus is a species of beetle in the family Cerambycidae. It was described by Lepesme and Breuning in 1964.
