= Jordanoleiopus conradti =

Scientific classification
- Domain: Eukaryota
- Kingdom: Animalia
- Phylum: Arthropoda
- Class: Insecta
- Order: Coleoptera
- Suborder: Polyphaga
- Infraorder: Cucujiformia
- Family: Cerambycidae
- Genus: Jordanoleiopus
- Species: J. conradti

Binomial name
- Jordanoleiopus conradti (Aurivillius, 1907)

Species of beetle

Jordanoleiopus conradti is a species of beetle in the family Cerambycidae. It was described by Per Olof Christopher Aurivillius in 1907.
