= Jordanoleiopus endroedyi =

Scientific classification
- Kingdom: Animalia
- Phylum: Arthropoda
- Class: Insecta
- Order: Coleoptera
- Suborder: Polyphaga
- Infraorder: Cucujiformia
- Family: Cerambycidae
- Genus: Jordanoleiopus
- Species: J. endroedyi

Binomial name
- Jordanoleiopus endroedyi Breuning, 1972

Species of beetle

Jordanoleiopus endroedyi is a species of beetle in the family Cerambycidae. It was described by Austrian entomologist Stephan von Breuning in 1972.
