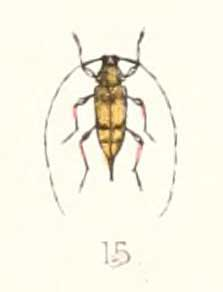

Scientific classification
- Domain: Eukaryota
- Kingdom: Animalia
- Phylum: Arthropoda
- Class: Insecta
- Order: Coleoptera
- Suborder: Polyphaga
- Infraorder: Cucujiformia
- Family: Cerambycidae
- Genus: Jordanoleiopus
- Species: J. mocquerysi

Binomial name
- Jordanoleiopus mocquerysi (Jordan, 1894)

= Jordanoleiopus mocquerysi =

Species of beetle

Jordanoleiopus mocquerysi is a species of beetle in the family Cerambycidae. It was described by Karl Jordan in 1894.

== Distribution ==
Jordanoleiopus mocquerysi is endemic to Cameroon, where it's found by the capital Yaoundé.
