= Jordanoleiopus gardneri =

Scientific classification
- Kingdom: Animalia
- Phylum: Arthropoda
- Class: Insecta
- Order: Coleoptera
- Suborder: Polyphaga
- Infraorder: Cucujiformia
- Family: Cerambycidae
- Genus: Jordanoleiopus
- Species: J. gardneri

Binomial name
- Jordanoleiopus gardneri Breuning, 1958

Species of beetle

Jordanoleiopus gardneri is a species of beetle in the family Cerambycidae. It was described by Stephan von Breuning in 1958.
