= Jordanoleiopus abyssinicus =

Scientific classification
- Kingdom: Animalia
- Phylum: Arthropoda
- Clade: Pancrustacea
- Class: Insecta
- Order: Coleoptera
- Suborder: Polyphaga
- Infraorder: Cucujiformia
- Family: Cerambycidae
- Genus: Jordanoleiopus
- Species: J. abyssinicus

Binomial name
- Jordanoleiopus abyssinicus Breuning, 1961

Species of beetle

Jordanoleiopus abyssinicus is a species of beetle in the family Cerambycidae. Stephan von Breuning described it in 1961.
