= Jordanoleiopus niger =

Scientific classification
- Kingdom: Animalia
- Phylum: Arthropoda
- Class: Insecta
- Order: Coleoptera
- Suborder: Polyphaga
- Infraorder: Cucujiformia
- Family: Cerambycidae
- Genus: Jordanoleiopus
- Species: J. niger

Binomial name
- Jordanoleiopus niger Breuning, 1969

Species of beetle

Jordanoleiopus niger is a species of beetle in the family Cerambycidae. It was described by Stephan von Breuning in 1969.
