= Jordanoleiopus flavomaculatus =

Scientific classification
- Kingdom: Animalia
- Phylum: Arthropoda
- Class: Insecta
- Order: Coleoptera
- Suborder: Polyphaga
- Infraorder: Cucujiformia
- Family: Cerambycidae
- Genus: Jordanoleiopus
- Species: J. flavomaculatus

Binomial name
- Jordanoleiopus flavomaculatus Hunt & Breuning, 1957

Species of beetle

Jordanoleiopus flavomaculatus is a species of beetle in the family Cerambycidae. It was described by Hunt and Breuning in 1957.
