= Jordanoleiopus polymistus =

Scientific classification
- Domain: Eukaryota
- Kingdom: Animalia
- Phylum: Arthropoda
- Class: Insecta
- Order: Coleoptera
- Suborder: Polyphaga
- Infraorder: Cucujiformia
- Family: Cerambycidae
- Genus: Jordanoleiopus
- Species: J. polymistus

Binomial name
- Jordanoleiopus polymistus (Distant, 1905)

Species of beetle

Jordanoleiopus polymistus is a species of beetle in the family Cerambycidae. It was described by William Lucas Distant in 1905.
