= Jordanoleiopus maynei =

Scientific classification
- Kingdom: Animalia
- Phylum: Arthropoda
- Class: Insecta
- Order: Coleoptera
- Suborder: Polyphaga
- Infraorder: Cucujiformia
- Family: Cerambycidae
- Genus: Jordanoleiopus
- Species: J. maynei

Binomial name
- Jordanoleiopus maynei Lepesme & Breuning, 1955

Species of beetle

Jordanoleiopus maynei is a species of beetle in the family Cerambycidae. It was described by Lepesme and Breuning in 1955.
