= Jordanoleiopus catops =

Scientific classification
- Domain: Eukaryota
- Kingdom: Animalia
- Phylum: Arthropoda
- Class: Insecta
- Order: Coleoptera
- Suborder: Polyphaga
- Infraorder: Cucujiformia
- Family: Cerambycidae
- Genus: Jordanoleiopus
- Species: J. catops

Binomial name
- Jordanoleiopus catops (Jordan, 1903)

Species of beetle

Jordanoleiopus catops is a species of beetle in the family Cerambycidae. It was described by Karl Jordan in 1903.
