= Paraphelileiopus hautmanni =

Scientific classification
- Kingdom: Animalia
- Phylum: Arthropoda
- Clade: Pancrustacea
- Class: Insecta
- Order: Coleoptera
- Suborder: Polyphaga
- Infraorder: Cucujiformia
- Family: Cerambycidae
- Genus: Paraphelileiopus
- Species: P. hautmanni

Binomial name
- Paraphelileiopus hautmanni (Breuning, 1956)

Synonyms
- Jordanoleiopus (Paraphelileiopus) hautmanni Breuning, 1956

Species of beetle

Paraphelileiopus hautmanni is a species of beetle in the family Cerambycidae. It was described by Stephan von Breuning in 1956. It is known from the Democratic Republic of the Congo.

Paraphelileiopus hautmanni measure 6.5 mm (0.26 in) in length.
