= Paraphelileiopus paraphelis =

Scientific classification
- Kingdom: Animalia
- Phylum: Arthropoda
- Clade: Pancrustacea
- Class: Insecta
- Order: Coleoptera
- Suborder: Polyphaga
- Infraorder: Cucujiformia
- Family: Cerambycidae
- Genus: Paraphelileiopus
- Species: P. paraphelis

Binomial name
- Paraphelileiopus paraphelis (Jordan, 1903)

Synonyms
- Leiopus paraphelis Jordan, 1903; Leiopus nigrofasciatus Aurivillius, 1907; Jordanoleiopus (Paraphelileiopus) paraphelis (Jordan, 1903)

Species of beetle

Paraphelileiopus paraphelis is a species of beetle in the family Cerambycidae. It was described by Karl Jordan in 1903. It is known from Gabon, Equatorial Guinea, and Cameroon.

Paraphelileiopus paraphelis measure 6–7.5 mm (0.24–0.30 in) in length.
