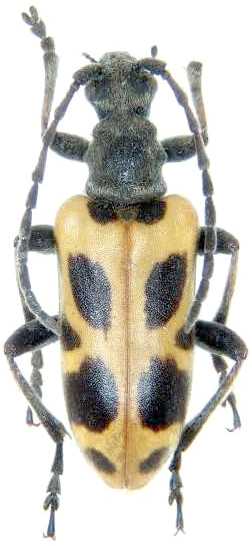
- Brachyta interrogationis shapsugorum Lazarev, 2011 (Holotype)

Scientific classification
- Kingdom: Animalia
- Phylum: Arthropoda
- Class: Insecta
- Order: Coleoptera
- Suborder: Polyphaga
- Infraorder: Cucujiformia
- Family: Cerambycidae
- Genus: Brachyta
- Species: B. interrogationis
- Subspecies: B. i. shapsugorum

Trinomial name
- Brachyta interrogationis shapsugorum Lazarev, 2019

= Brachyta interrogationis shapsugorum =

Subspecies of beetle

Brachyta interrogationis shapsugorum is a subspecies of beetle in the family Cerambycidae. It was described by Maxim Lazarev in 2011. It is known from Russia.
