= Brachyta punctata =

Scientific classification
- Domain: Eukaryota
- Kingdom: Animalia
- Phylum: Arthropoda
- Class: Insecta
- Order: Coleoptera
- Suborder: Polyphaga
- Infraorder: Cucujiformia
- Family: Cerambycidae
- Genus: Brachyta
- Species: B. punctata

Binomial name
- Brachyta punctata (Faldermann, 1833)

Synonyms
- Brachyta interrogationis m. punctata (Faldermann) Villiers, 1978; Brachyta interrogationis sochondensis Tshernyshev & Dubatolov, 2005; Evodinus interrogationis ab. punctatus (Faldermann) Matsushita, 1933; Evodinus punctatus (Faldermann) Aurivillius, 1912; Pachyta punctata Faldermann, 1833

Species of beetle

Brachyta punctata is the species of beetle in the family Cerambycidae. This beetle is distributed in China, Mongolia, and Russia.

== Subspecies ==
- Brachyta punctata punctata Faldermann, 1833
- Brachyta punctata lazarevi Danilevsky, 2014
