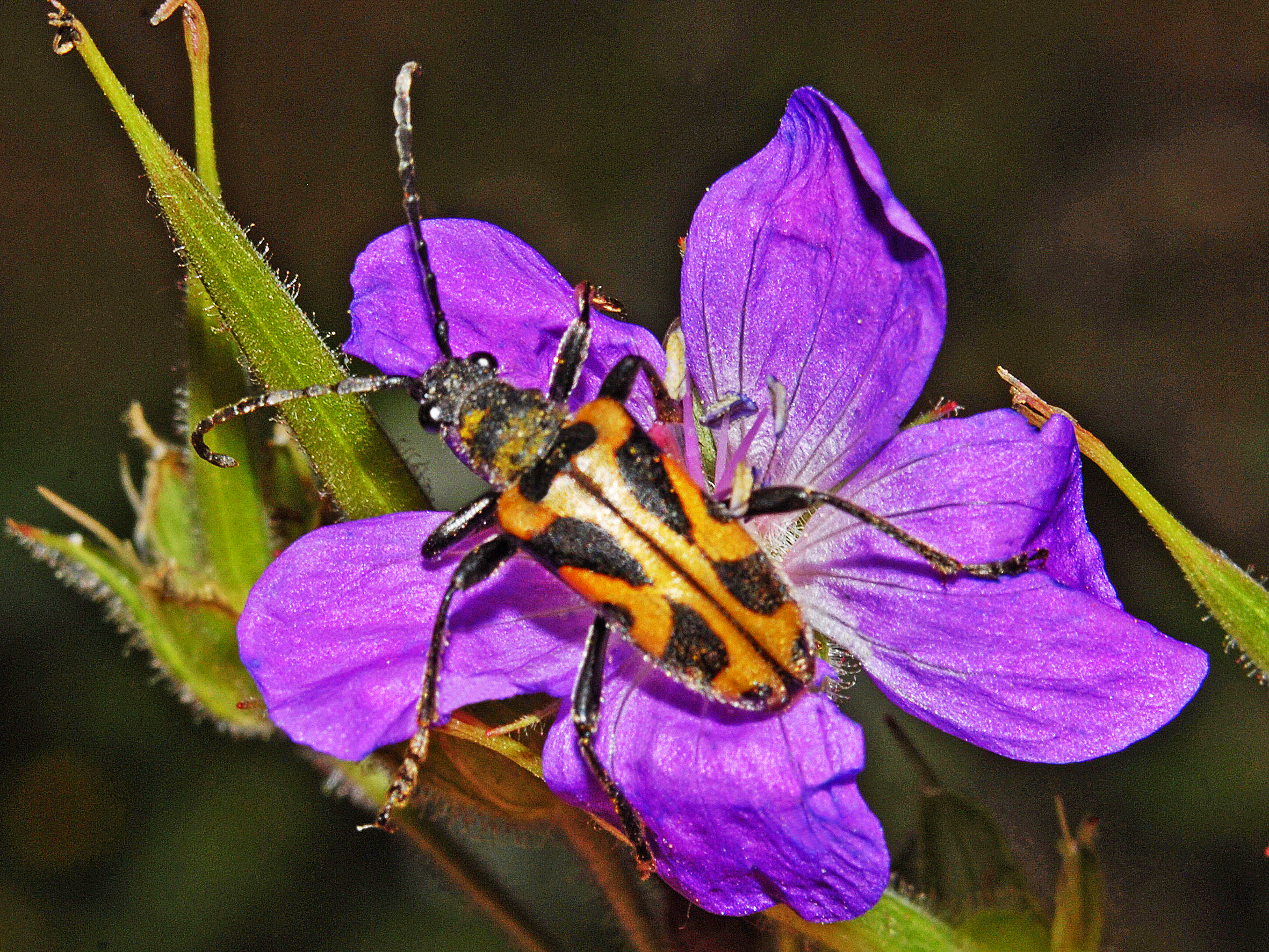
- Yellow form
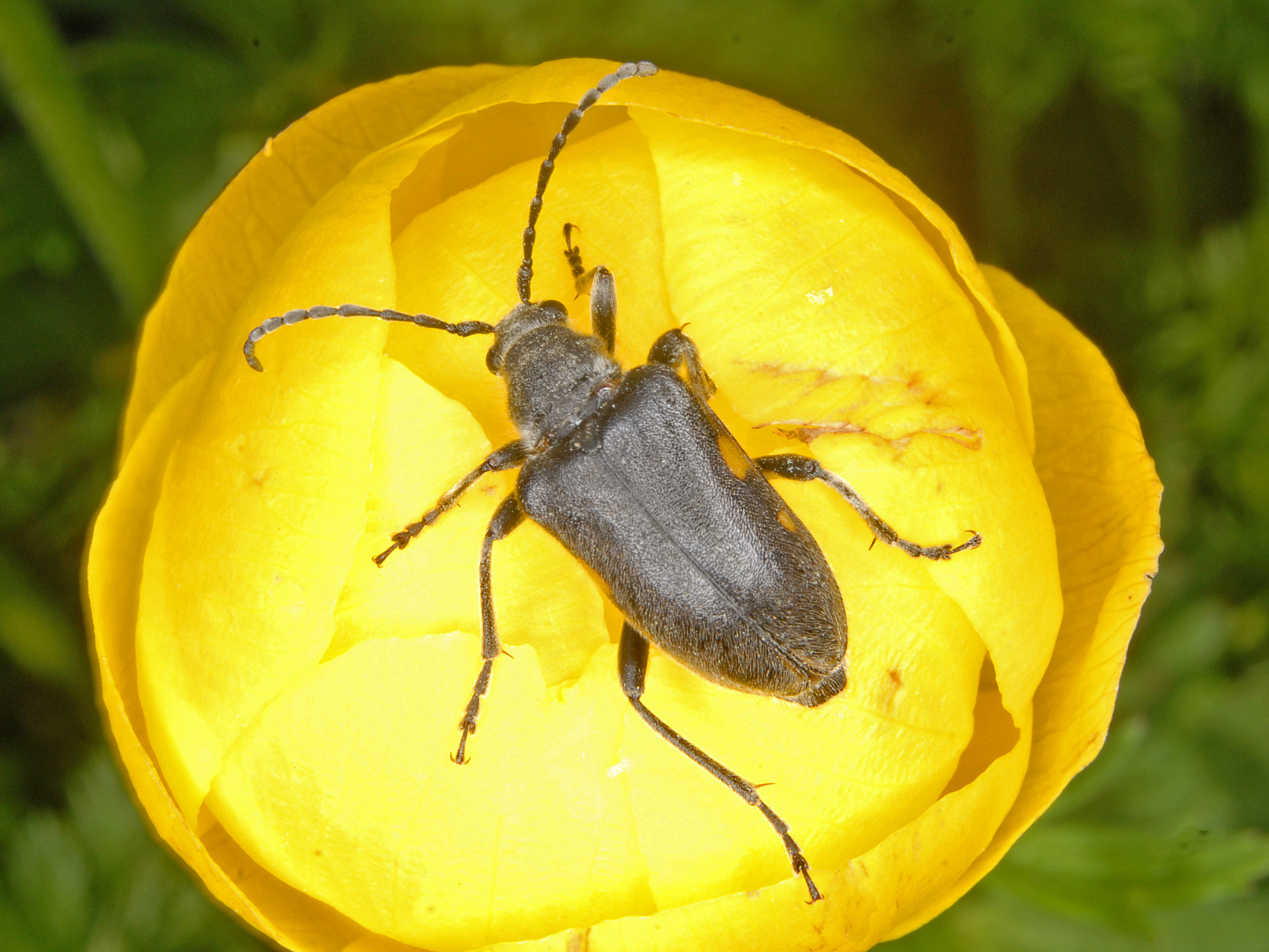
- Female, black form

Scientific classification
- Kingdom: Animalia
- Phylum: Arthropoda
- Class: Insecta
- Order: Coleoptera
- Suborder: Polyphaga
- Infraorder: Cucujiformia
- Family: Cerambycidae
- Genus: Brachyta
- Species: B. interrogationis

Binomial name
- Brachyta interrogationis (Linnaeus, 1758)

Synonyms
- List: Brachyta altaiensis Pic, 1900; Brachyta externereducta Pic, 1926; Brachyta immaculatus Pic, 1934; Brachyta kraatzi Ganglbauer, 1889; Brachyta mulsanti Pic, 1934; Brachyta multiguttatus Pic, 1934; Brachyta plavilstshikovi Pic, 1934; Brachyta prescutellaris Pic, 1934; Brachyta reducta Pic, 1926; Brachyta suturalis Pic, 1926; Evodinus dorensis Pic, 1933; Evodinus mannerheimi Motschulsky, 1860; Evodinus mesmini Pic, 1933; Evodinus milliati Pic, 1934; Evodinus modanensis Pic, 1933; Evodinus perroudi Pic, 1933; Evodinus subinterruptus Pic, 1934; Leptura duodecimmaculata Fabricius, 1781; Leptura interrogationis Linnaeus, 1758; Leptura marginella Fabricius, 1792; Leptura russica Herbst, 1784; Pachyta 12-maculata; Pachyta 12-maculata var. bimaculata Mulsant, 1839; Pachyta 12-maculata var. ebenina Mulsant, 1839; Pachyta bimaculata Mulsant, 1839; Pachyta bioculata Kraatz, 1879; Pachyta cruciata Kraatz, 1879; Pachyta crucifera Kraatz, 1879; Pachyta curvilineata Mulsant, 1839; Pachyta ebenina Mulsant, 1839; Pachyta flavolineata Mulsant, 1839; Pachyta marginalis Motschulsky, 1875; Pachyta obsidiana Motschulsky, 1875

= Brachyta interrogationis =

Species of beetle

Brachyta interrogationis is the species of the Lepturinae subfamily in Cerambycidae family. This species was described in 1758 by Carl Linnaeus in the 10th edition of Systema Naturae under the name Leptura interrogationis.

== Subspecies ==
- Brachyta interrogationis interrogationis Linnaeus, 1758
- Brachyta interrogationis duodecimmaculata Fabricius, 1781
- Brachyta interrogationis ebenina Mulsant, 1839
- Brachyta interrogationis eitschbergeri Danilevsky & Peks, 2015
- Brachyta interrogationis gabzdili Danilevsky & Peks, 2016
- Brachyta interrogationis lederi Lazarev, 2011
- Brachyta interrogationis mannerheimii Motschulsky, 1860
- Brachyta interrogationis marginella Fabricius, 1793
- Brachyta interrogationis miroshnikovi Lazarev, 2011
- Brachyta interrogationis russica Herbst, 1784
- Brachyta interrogationis shapsugorum Lazarev, 2011:
- Brachyta interrogationis zubovi Lazarev, 2016

== Distribution ==
This species mainly occurs in Central Europe (Austria, Northern Czech Republic, Finland, France, Eastern Germany, Northern Italy, Norway, Southern Poland, Eastern Slovakia, Sweden and Switzerland), Caucasus, east to Western Russia, Kazakhstan, Siberia, Mongolia, Manchuria, Korea and Japan.

== Habitat ==
In Europe, this species is boreal-mountainous, reaching south to the Italian and French Alps, and north to the Arctic Circle. In the Alps, these beetles can be found at elevations up to 2700 meters above sea level.

== Description ==
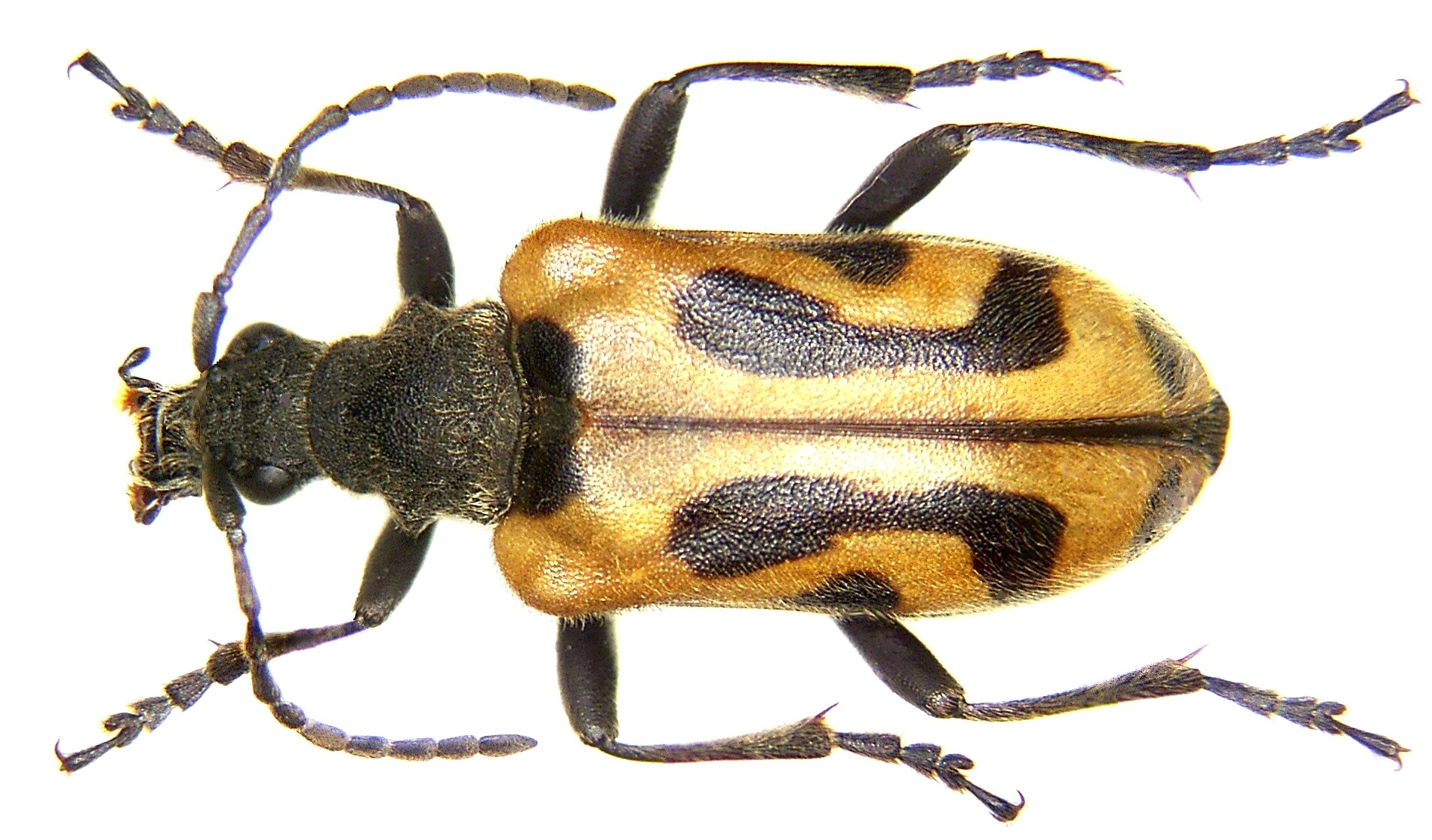

Brachyta interrogationis can reach approximately a body length of 9–19 millimetres (0.35–0.75 in). They have a black body. Pronotum is convex, with dense punctuation. Also head, thorax and legs are black. Legs are relatively long and slender. The elytra are characterized by a very high variability and more than 150 varietas have been described. Sometimes the elitra are completely black or completely yellow, but usually they are brownish-yellow, with black spots on scutellum, two longitudinal black arcuate bands, and black spots on the sides and on the apex. Antennae are composed by 5-11 segments.

== Biology ==
The adult beetles can be seen on flowers from around May to August. They mainly feed on leaves, petals and pollen of flowers of wood cranesbill, but also on wild angelica (Angelica sylvestris), Anemone, plumeless thistles (Carduus species), hogweed (Heracleum species), Bupleurum species, peony and spurge (Euphorbia species).

The larva develop in the soil, feeding on roots of grasses and other perennial plants. in which they dig longitudinal galleries. The development time from larva to imago takes one to two years. Then they form a pupation chamber, from which the imago leaves in May and June.
