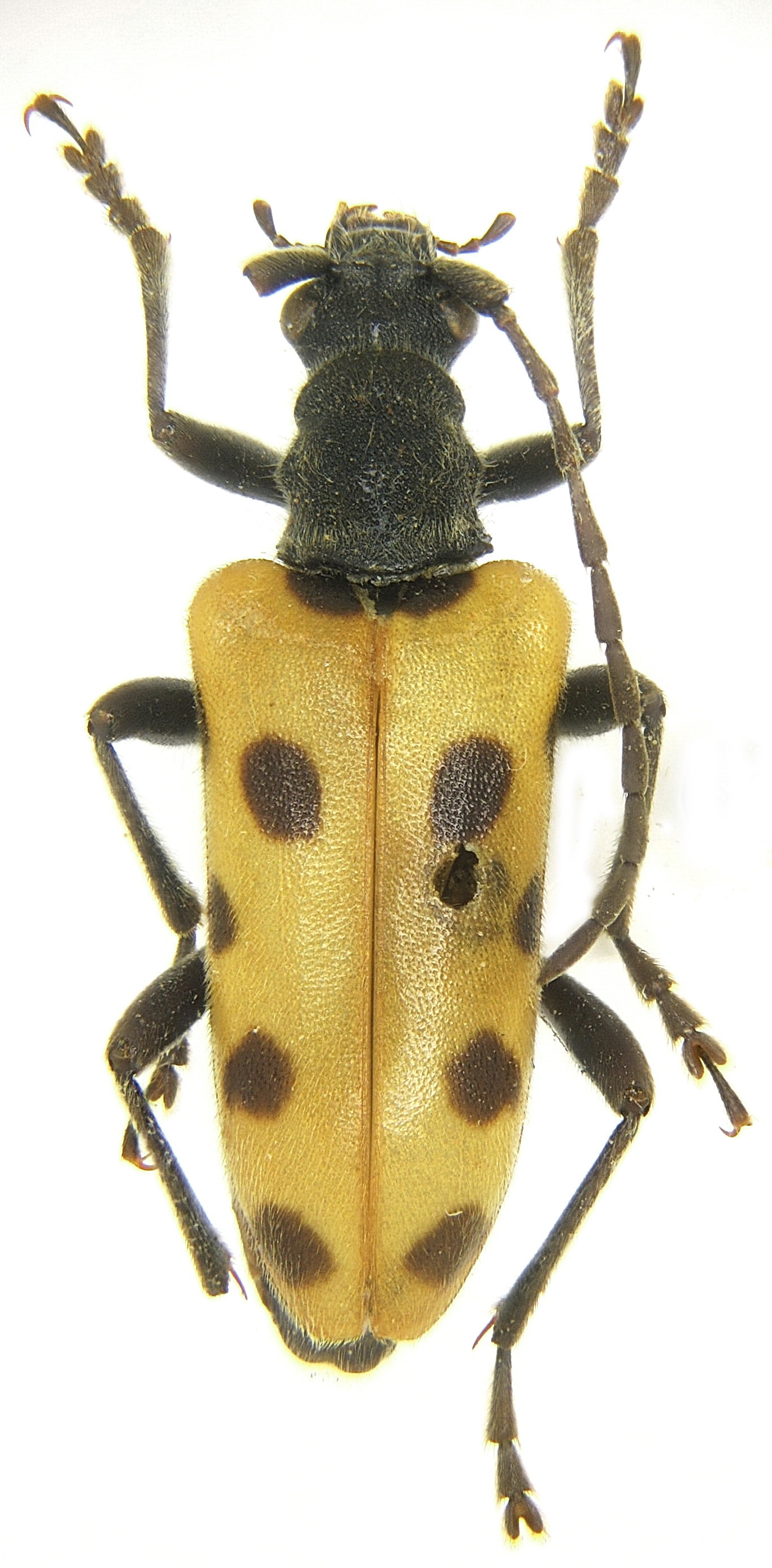
- Brachyta punctata lazarevi Danilevsky, 2014 (Holotype, male)

Scientific classification
- Kingdom: Animalia
- Phylum: Arthropoda
- Class: Insecta
- Order: Coleoptera
- Suborder: Polyphaga
- Infraorder: Cucujiformia
- Family: Cerambycidae
- Genus: Brachyta
- Species: B. punctata
- Subspecies: B. p. lazarevi

Trinomial name
- Brachyta punctata lazarevi Danilevsky, 2014

= Brachyta punctata lazarevi =

Species of beetle

Brachyta punctata lazarevi is a subspecies of beetle in the family Cerambycidae. It was described by Danilevsky in 2014. It is known from North Korea, Gô-Sui. The holotype is kept in the collection of the Zoological Museum of Moscow University. The species is named after the longhorned beetle specialist Maxim Lazarev.
