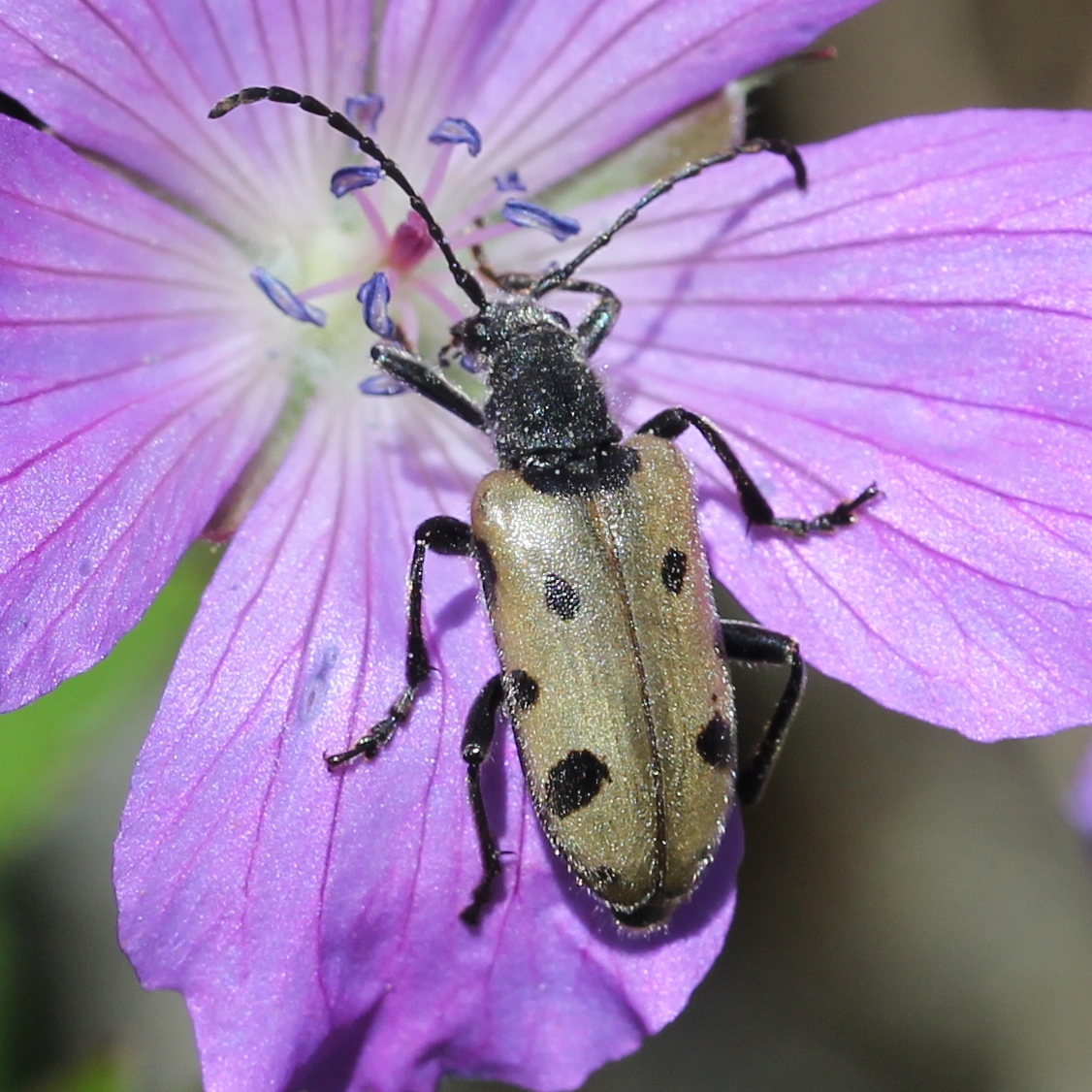
- On Geranium yesoense

Scientific classification
- Domain: Eukaryota
- Kingdom: Animalia
- Phylum: Arthropoda
- Class: Insecta
- Order: Coleoptera
- Suborder: Polyphaga
- Infraorder: Cucujiformia
- Family: Cerambycidae
- Genus: Brachyta
- Species: B. danilevskyii

Binomial name
- Brachyta danilevskyii Tshernyshev & Dubatolov, 2005

Synonyms
- List: Evodinus interrogationis ab. duodecimmaculatus Matsushita, 1933; Evodinus interrogationis f. japonicus Fujimura, 1956; Brachyta interrogationis punctata (Faldermann) Hayashi, 1980; Brachyta punctata (Faldermann) Niisato, 1997; Evodinus interrogationis punctatus (Faldermann) Tamanuki, 1939

= Brachyta danilevskyii =

Species of beetle

Brachyta danilevskyii is a species of long-horned beetle in the subfamily Lepturinae. This beetle is found in Japan.
