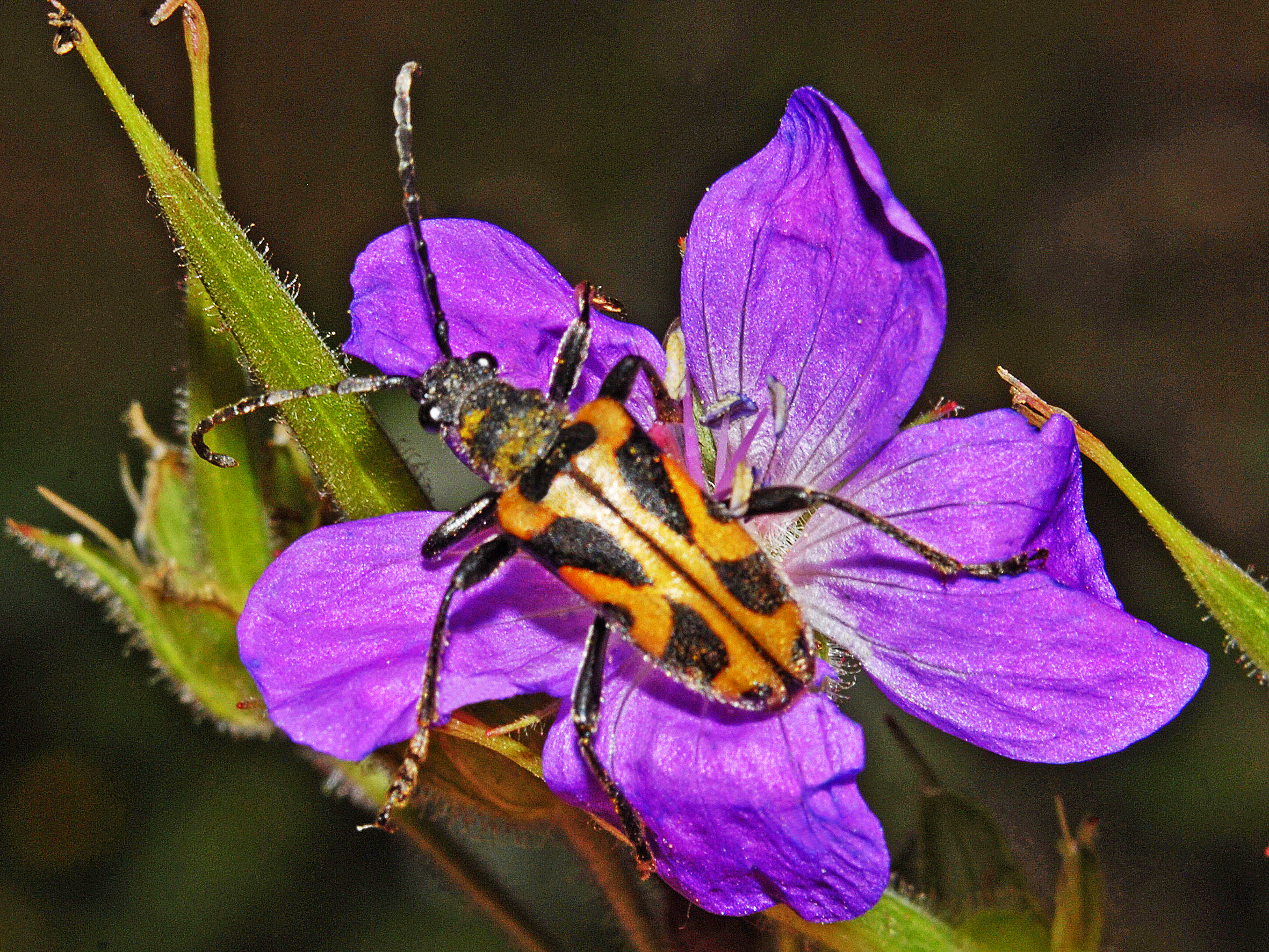
- Brachyta interrogationis

Scientific classification
- Kingdom: Animalia
- Phylum: Arthropoda
- Class: Insecta
- Order: Coleoptera
- Suborder: Polyphaga
- Infraorder: Cucujiformia
- Family: Cerambycidae
- Subfamily: Lepturinae
- Genus: Brachyta; Fairmaire in Jacquelin du Val, 1864

= Brachyta =

Genus of beetles

Brachyta is a genus of beetles in the subfamily Lepturinae in of the family Cerambycidae.

== Species ==
Species within this genus include:

- Brachyta amurensis (Kraatz, 1879)
- Brachyta balcanica (Hampe, 1871)
- Brachyta bifasciata (Olivier, 1792)
- Brachyta borni (Ganglbauer, 1903)
- Brachyta breiti (Tippmann, 1946)
- Brachyta caucasica Rost, 1892
- Brachyta danilevskyii Tshernyshev & Dubatolov, 2005
- Brachyta delagrangei Pic, 1891
- Brachyta dongbeiensis (Wang, 2003)
- Brachyta interrogationis (Linnaeus, 1758)
- Brachyta punctata (Faldermann, 1833)
  - Brachyta punctata lazarevi Danilevsky, 2014
- Brachyta rosti Pic, 1900
- Brachyta sachalinensis Matsumura, 1911
- Brachyta striolata (Gebler, 1817)
- Brachyta variabilis (Gebler, 1817)
