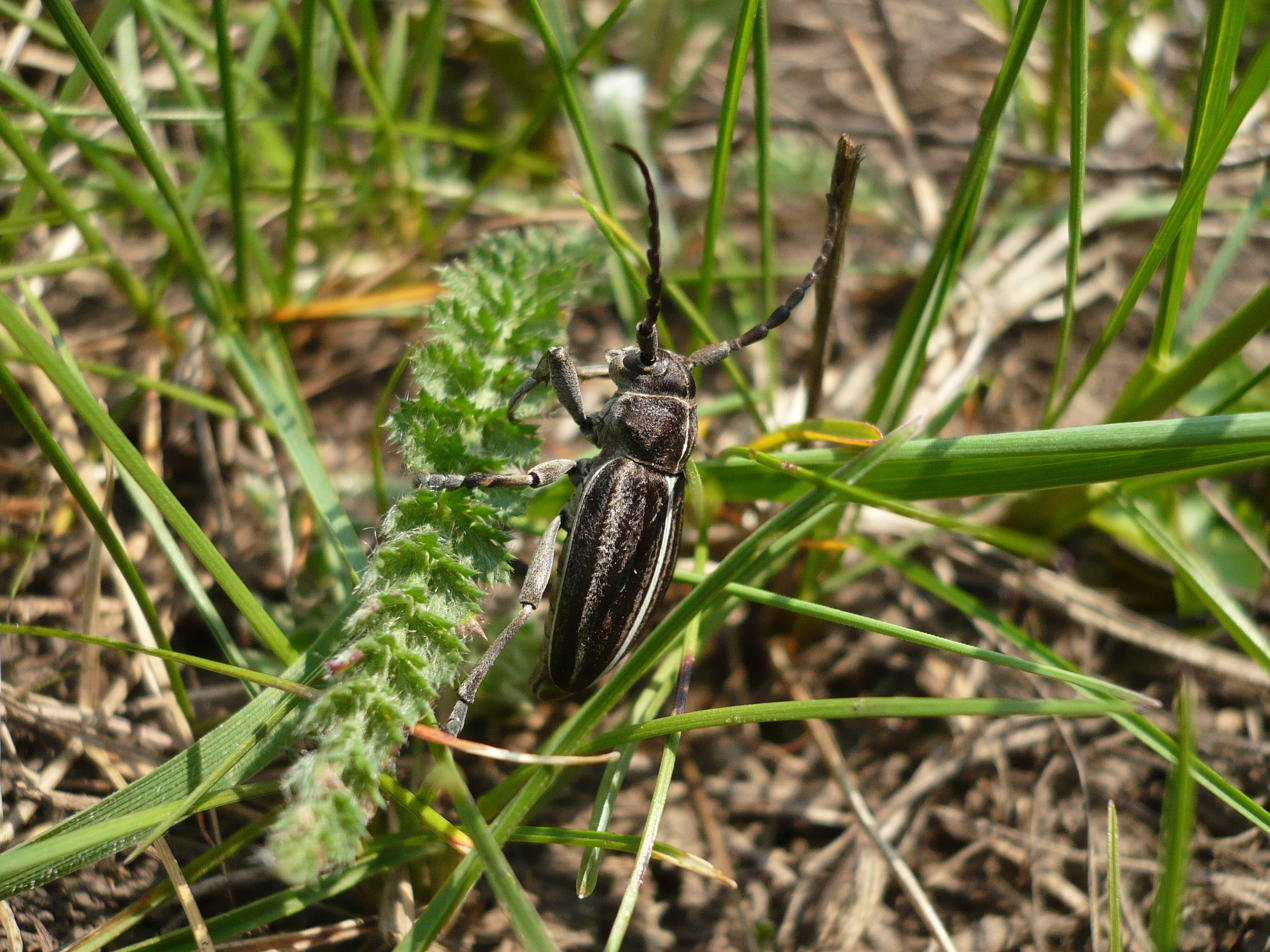

Scientific classification
- Kingdom: Animalia
- Phylum: Arthropoda
- Clade: Pancrustacea
- Class: Insecta
- Order: Coleoptera
- Suborder: Polyphaga
- Infraorder: Cucujiformia
- Family: Cerambycidae
- Genus: Dorcadion
- Species: D. holosericeum

Binomial name
- Dorcadion holosericeum Krynicky, 1832

Synonyms
- Autodorcadion holosericeum; Dorcadion striatum Dalman, 1817; Pedestredorcadion holosericeum (Krynicky, 1832)

= Dorcadion holosericeum =

Species of beetle

Dorcadion holosericeum is a species of beetle in the family Cerambycidae. It was described by Krynicky in 1832. It is known from Poland, Russia, Belarus, Bulgaria, Moldova, Romania, Slovakia, Georgia, and Ukraine.

== Subspecies ==
- Dorcadion holosericeum holosericeum Krynicki, 1832
- Dorcadion holosericeum tristriatum Suvorov, 1913
