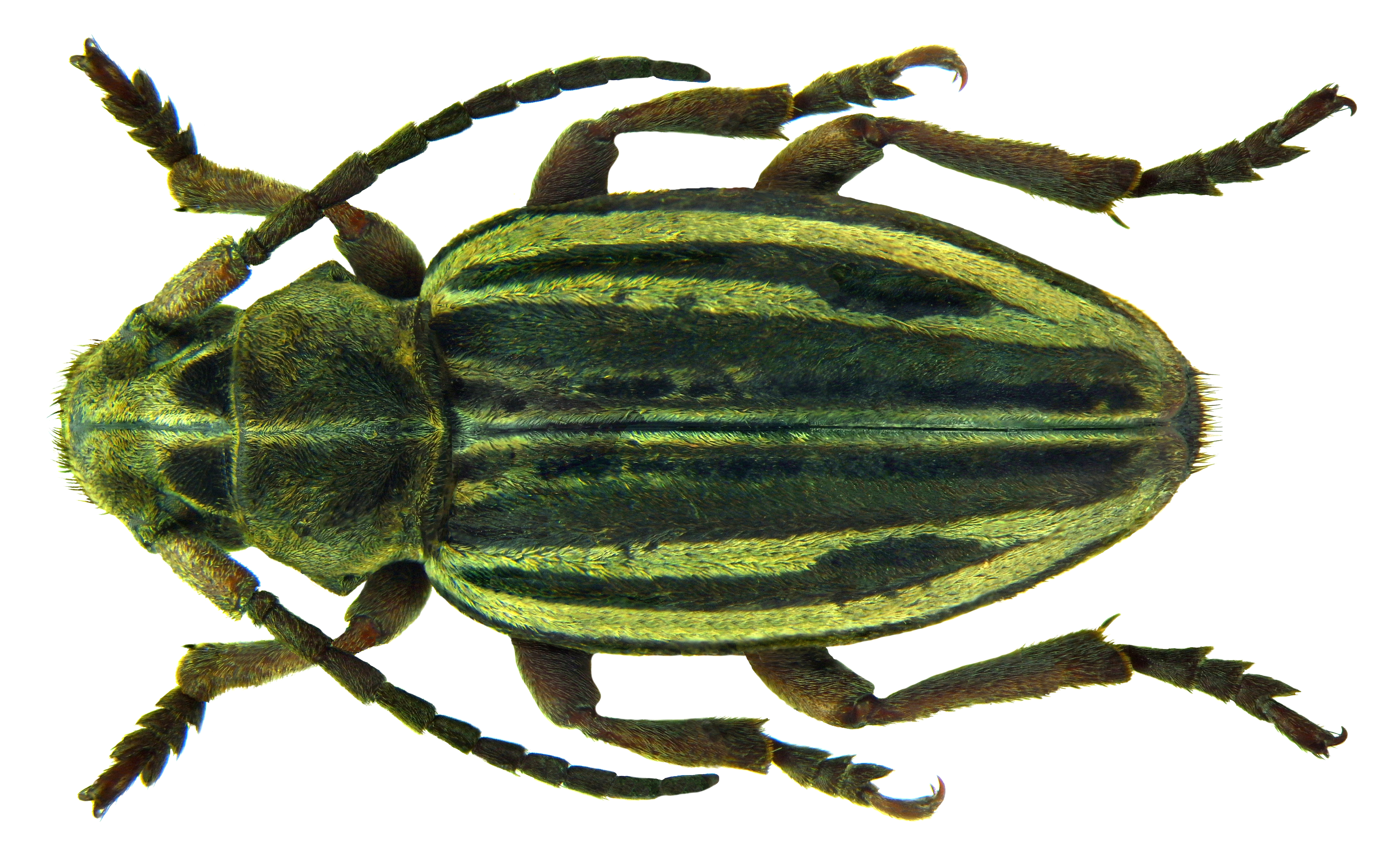

Scientific classification
- Kingdom: Animalia
- Phylum: Arthropoda
- Clade: Pancrustacea
- Class: Insecta
- Order: Coleoptera
- Suborder: Polyphaga
- Infraorder: Cucujiformia
- Family: Cerambycidae
- Genus: Dorcadion
- Species: D. piochardi

Binomial name
- Dorcadion piochardi Kraatz, 1873

Synonyms
- Dorcadion piochardi piochardi (Kraatz) Breuning & Villiers, 1967; Dorcadion varievittatum Pic, 1942

= Dorcadion piochardi =

Species of beetle

Dorcadion piochardi is a species of beetle in the family Cerambycidae. It was described by Kraatz in 1873. It is known from Turkey.

== Varietas ==
- Dorcadion piochardi var. apicedisparatum Breuning, 1946
- Dorcadion piochardi var. ladikense Breuning & Villiers, 1967
- Dorcadion piochardi var. pelops Jakovlev, 1901
- Dorcadion piochardi var. roberti Pic, 1905
