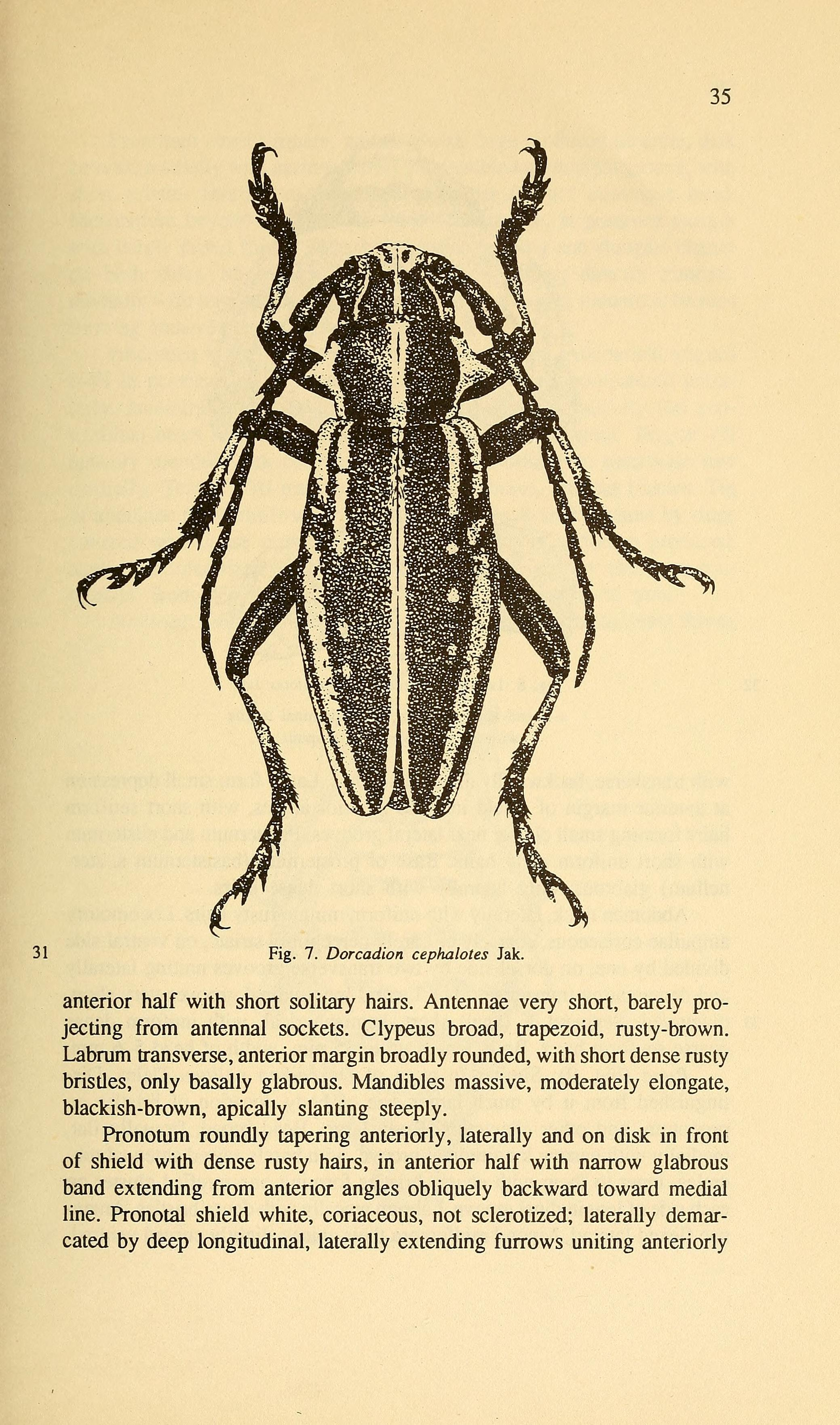
- Illustration of D. cephalotes

Scientific classification
- Kingdom: Animalia
- Phylum: Arthropoda
- Clade: Pancrustacea
- Class: Insecta
- Order: Coleoptera
- Suborder: Polyphaga
- Infraorder: Cucujiformia
- Family: Cerambycidae
- Genus: Dorcadion
- Species: D. cephalotes

Binomial name
- Dorcadion cephalotes Jakovlev, 1890

= Dorcadion cephalotes =

Species of beetle

Dorcadion cephalotes is a species of beetle in the family Cerambycidae. It was described by Jakovlev in 1890.

== See also ==
Dorcadion
