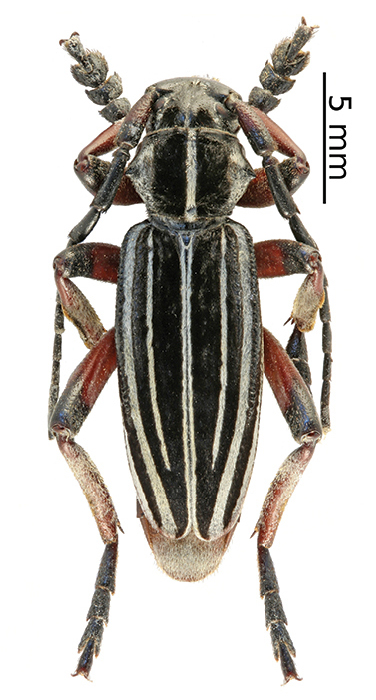
- Dorcadion tianshanskii radkevitshi (male)

Scientific classification
- Kingdom: Animalia
- Phylum: Arthropoda
- Clade: Pancrustacea
- Class: Insecta
- Order: Coleoptera
- Suborder: Polyphaga
- Infraorder: Cucujiformia
- Family: Cerambycidae
- Genus: Dorcadion
- Species: D. tianshanskii

Binomial name
- Dorcadion tianshanskii Suvorov, 1910

= Dorcadion tianshanskii =

Species of beetle

Dorcadion tianshanskii is a species of beetle in the family Cerambycidae. It was described by Suvorov in 1910.

== Subspecies ==
- Dorcadion tianshanskii heptapotamicum Plavilstshikov, 1951
- Dorcadion tianshanskii radkevitshi Suvorov, 1910
- Dorcadion tianshanskii tianshanskii Suvorov, 1910
- Dorcadion tianshanskii vallesum Danilevsky, 1999

== See also ==
- Dorcadion
