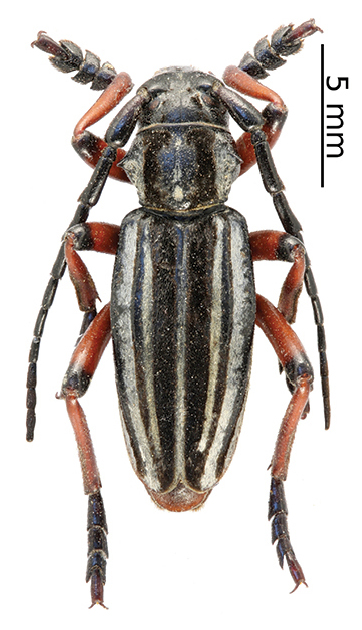

Scientific classification
- Kingdom: Animalia
- Phylum: Arthropoda
- Clade: Pancrustacea
- Class: Insecta
- Order: Coleoptera
- Suborder: Polyphaga
- Infraorder: Cucujiformia
- Family: Cerambycidae
- Genus: Dorcadion
- Species: D. arietinum

Binomial name
- Dorcadion arietinum Jakovlev, 1897

= Dorcadion arietinum =

Species of beetle

Dorcadion arietinum is a species of beetle in the family Cerambycidae. It was described by Jakovlev in 1897.

== Subspecies ==
- Dorcadion arietinum arietinum Jakovlev, 1897
- Dorcadion arietinum charynensis Danilevsky, 1996
- Dorcadion arietinum chilikensis Danilevsky, 1996
- Dorcadion arietinum ketmeniensis Danilevsky, 1996
- Dorcadion arietinum lucae Pic, 1898
- Dorcadion arietinum phenax Jakovlev, 1900
- Dorcadion arietinum zhalanash Danilevsky, 1996

== See also ==
- Dorcadion
