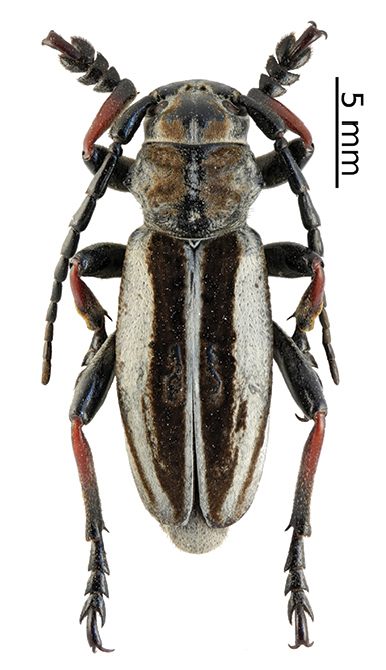

Scientific classification
- Kingdom: Animalia
- Phylum: Arthropoda
- Clade: Pancrustacea
- Class: Insecta
- Order: Coleoptera
- Suborder: Polyphaga
- Infraorder: Cucujiformia
- Family: Cerambycidae
- Genus: Dorcadion
- Species: D. crassipes

Binomial name
- Dorcadion crassipes Ballion in 1878

= Dorcadion crassipes =

Species of beetle

Dorcadion crassipes is a species of beetle in the family Cerambycidae. It was described Ballion by 1878.

== Subspecies ==
- Dorcadion crassipes crassipes Ballion, 1878
- Dorcadion crassipes glazunovi Suvorov, 1910
- Dorcadion crassipes validipes Jakovlev, 1906

== See also ==
Dorcadion
