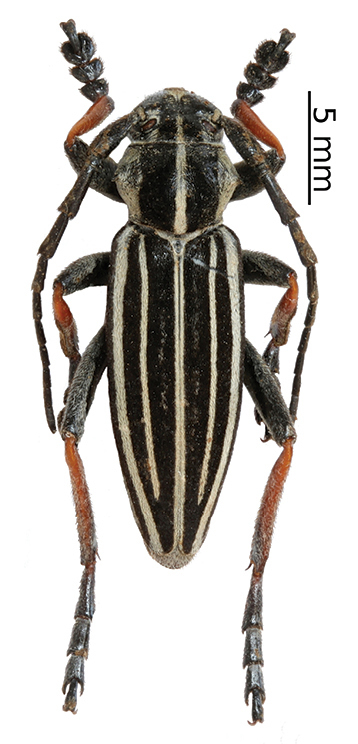

Scientific classification
- Kingdom: Animalia
- Phylum: Arthropoda
- Clade: Pancrustacea
- Class: Insecta
- Order: Coleoptera
- Suborder: Polyphaga
- Infraorder: Cucujiformia
- Family: Cerambycidae
- Genus: Dorcadion
- Species: D. unidiscale

Binomial name
- Dorcadion unidiscale Danilevsky, 1996

Synonyms
- Dorcadion globithorax unidiscale Danilevsky, 1996

= Dorcadion unidiscale =

Species of beetle

Dorcadion unidiscale is a species of beetle in the family Cerambycidae. It was described by Mikhail Leontievich Danilevsky in 1996.
