= Dorcadion semiargentatum =

Scientific classification
- Kingdom: Animalia
- Phylum: Arthropoda
- Clade: Pancrustacea
- Class: Insecta
- Order: Coleoptera
- Suborder: Polyphaga
- Infraorder: Cucujiformia
- Family: Cerambycidae
- Genus: Dorcadion
- Species: D. semiargentatum

Binomial name
- Dorcadion semiargentatum Pic, 1905

Synonyms
- Dorcadion shiita Plavilstshikov, 1951; Pedestredorcadion glaucum descampsi Villiers, 1967

Species of beetle

Dorcadion semiargentatum is a species of beetle in the family Cerambycidae. It was described by Maurice Pic in 1905. It is known from Iran.

== Subspecies ==
- Dorcadion semiargentatum burdzushense Danilevsky & Murzin, 2009
- Dorcadion semiargentatum ortrudheinzae Danilevsky, 1998
- Dorcadion semiargentatum sarabense Holzschuh, 1993
- Dorcadion semiargentatum sementivum Danilevsky & Murzin, 2009
- Dorcadion semiargentatum semiargentatum Pic, 1905
