= Dorcadion septemlineatum =

Scientific classification
- Kingdom: Animalia
- Phylum: Arthropoda
- Clade: Pancrustacea
- Class: Insecta
- Order: Coleoptera
- Suborder: Polyphaga
- Infraorder: Cucujiformia
- Family: Cerambycidae
- Genus: Dorcadion
- Species: D. septemlineatum

Binomial name
- Dorcadion septemlineatum Waltl, 1838

Synonyms
- Pedestredorcadion septemlineatum (Waltl, 1838)

Species of beetle

Dorcadion septemlineatum is a species of beetle in the family Cerambycidae. It was described by Waltl in 1838. It is known from Turkey, and possibly Bulgaria and Greece.

== Subspecies ==
- Dorcadion septemlineatum abanti Braun, 1976
- Dorcadion septemlineatum demirciense Breuning, 1966
- Dorcadion septemlineatum novemlineatum Kraatz, 1873
- Dorcadion septemlineatum octolineatum Kraatz, 1873
- Dorcadion septemlineatum septemlineatum Waltl, 1838
