= Dorcadion laeve =

Scientific classification
- Kingdom: Animalia
- Phylum: Arthropoda
- Clade: Pancrustacea
- Class: Insecta
- Order: Coleoptera
- Suborder: Polyphaga
- Infraorder: Cucujiformia
- Family: Cerambycidae
- Genus: Dorcadion
- Species: D. laeve

Binomial name
- Dorcadion laeve Faldermann, 1837

Synonyms
- Dorcadion persicum Faldermann, 1837; Dorcadion plasoni Ganglbauer, 1884

Species of beetle

Dorcadion laeve is a species of beetle in the family Cerambycidae. It was described by Faldermann in 1837. It is known from Iran, Armenia, and Turkey.

== Subspecies ==
- Dorcadion laeve hyrcanum Jakovlev, 1900
- Dorcadion laeve laeve Faldermann, 1837
- Dorcadion laeve micula Plavilstshikov, 1937
- Dorcadion laeve vladimiri Danilevsky & Murzin, 2009
