= Dorcadion sareptanum =

Scientific classification
- Kingdom: Animalia
- Phylum: Arthropoda
- Clade: Pancrustacea
- Class: Insecta
- Order: Coleoptera
- Suborder: Polyphaga
- Infraorder: Cucujiformia
- Family: Cerambycidae
- Genus: Dorcadion
- Species: D. sareptanum

Binomial name
- Dorcadion sareptanum Kraatz, 1873

Synonyms
- Pedestredorcadion sareptanum (Kraatz) Sama, 2002

Species of beetle

Dorcadion sareptanum is a species of beetle in the family Cerambycidae. It was described by Kraatz in 1873. It is known from Kazakhstan and Russia.

== Subspecies ==
- Dorcadion sareptanum euxinum Suvorov, 1915
- Dorcadion sareptanum kubanicum Plavilstshikov, 1934
- Dorcadion sareptanum sareptanum Kraatz, 1873
- Dorcadion sareptanum striatiforme Suvorov, 1913
