= Dorcadion sturmii =

Scientific classification
- Kingdom: Animalia
- Phylum: Arthropoda
- Clade: Pancrustacea
- Class: Insecta
- Order: Coleoptera
- Suborder: Polyphaga
- Infraorder: Cucujiformia
- Family: Cerambycidae
- Genus: Dorcadion
- Species: D. sturmii

Binomial name
- Dorcadion sturmii Frivaldsky, 1837

Synonyms
- Pedestredorcadion sturmi (Frivaldszky) Sama, 2002 (misspelling)

Species of beetle

Dorcadion sturmii is a species of beetle in the family Cerambycidae. It was first described by Frivaldsky in 1837. It is known from Bulgaria and Turkey, and possibly North Macedonia.

== Varietas ==
- Dorcadion sturmii var. albofasciatum Breuning, 1946
- Dorcadion sturmii var. albotomentosum Breuning, 1946
- Dorcadion sturmii var. fulvofasciatum Breuning, 1946
