= Dorcadion praetermissum =

Scientific classification
- Kingdom: Animalia
- Phylum: Arthropoda
- Clade: Pancrustacea
- Class: Insecta
- Order: Coleoptera
- Suborder: Polyphaga
- Infraorder: Cucujiformia
- Family: Cerambycidae
- Genus: Dorcadion
- Species: D. praetermissum

Binomial name
- Dorcadion praetermissum Pesarini & Sabbadini, 1999

Species of beetle

Dorcadion praetermissum is a species of beetle in the family Cerambycidae. It was described by Pesarini and Sabbadini in 1999. It is known from Turkey. Dorcadion praetermissum is endemic to Turkey.

== Subspecies ==
- Dorcadion praetermissum mikhaili Özdikmen , 2010: The subspecies D. p. mikhaili was described by Özdikmen in 2010, with its type locality in Bolu province, Turkey.
- Dorcadion praetermissum praetermissum Pesarini & Sabbadini, 1999.
