= Dorcadion thessalicum =

Scientific classification
- Kingdom: Animalia
- Phylum: Arthropoda
- Clade: Pancrustacea
- Class: Insecta
- Order: Coleoptera
- Suborder: Polyphaga
- Infraorder: Cucujiformia
- Family: Cerambycidae
- Genus: Dorcadion
- Species: D. thessalicum

Binomial name
- Dorcadion thessalicum Pic, 1916

Synonyms
- Pedestredorcadion thessalicum (Pic, 1916); Dorcadion meteorum Breuning, 1969

Species of beetle

Dorcadion thessalicum is a species of beetle in the family Cerambycidae. It was described by Maurice Pic in 1916. It is known from Bulgaria and Greece.

== Subspecies ==
- Dorcadion thessalicum gioachinoi Pesarini & Sabbadini, 2007
- Dorcadion thessalicum pelionense Breit, 1923
- Dorcadion thessalicum thessalicum Pic, 1916
