= Dorcadion striolatum =

Scientific classification
- Kingdom: Animalia
- Phylum: Arthropoda
- Clade: Pancrustacea
- Class: Insecta
- Order: Coleoptera
- Suborder: Polyphaga
- Infraorder: Cucujiformia
- Family: Cerambycidae
- Genus: Dorcadion
- Species: D. striolatum

Binomial name
- Dorcadion striolatum Kraatz, 1873

Synonyms
- Dorcadion obesum Tournier, 1872 nec Gautier, 1870

Species of beetle

Dorcadion striolatum is a species of beetle in the family Cerambycidae. It was described by Kraatz in 1873. It is known from Georgia, Armenia, Turkey, and possibly Iran.

== Varietas ==
- Dorcadion striolatum var. brunnescens Breuning, 1948
- Dorcadion striolatum var. distinctefasciatum Breuning, 1946
- Dorcadion striolatum var. masculinum Plavilstshikov, 1926
