= Dorcadion subsericatum =

Scientific classification
- Kingdom: Animalia
- Phylum: Arthropoda
- Clade: Pancrustacea
- Class: Insecta
- Order: Coleoptera
- Suborder: Polyphaga
- Infraorder: Cucujiformia
- Family: Cerambycidae
- Genus: Dorcadion
- Species: D. subsericatum

Binomial name
- Dorcadion subsericatum Pic, 1901

Synonyms
- Dorcadion paphlagoniense Breuning, 1944

Species of beetle

Dorcadion subsericatum is a species of beetle in the family Cerambycidae. It was described by Maurice Pic in 1901. It is known from Turkey.

== Subspecies ==
- Dorcadion subsericatum major Breuning, 1962
- Dorcadion subsericatum rufipenne Breuning, 1946
- Dorcadion subsericatum subsericatum Pic, 1901
- Dorcadion subsericatum vulneratum Pesarini & Sabbadini, 1998
