= Dorcadion kollari =

Scientific classification
- Kingdom: Animalia
- Phylum: Arthropoda
- Clade: Pancrustacea
- Class: Insecta
- Order: Coleoptera
- Suborder: Polyphaga
- Infraorder: Cucujiformia
- Family: Cerambycidae
- Genus: Dorcadion
- Species: D. kollari

Binomial name
- Dorcadion kollari Kraatz, 1873

Synonyms
- Dorcadion henrici Pic, 1905; Dorcadion kollari m. dorsoimmaculipenne Breuning, 1966

Species of beetle

Dorcadion kollari is a species of beetle in the family Cerambycidae. It was described by Kraatz in 1873. It is known from Turkey.

== Varietas ==
- Dorcadion kollari var. anticepunctatum Breuning, 1946
- Dorcadion kollari var. quadripunctum Breuning, 1946
- Dorcadion kollari var. unipunctum Breuning, 1946
