= Dorcadion quadrimaculatum =

Scientific classification
- Kingdom: Animalia
- Phylum: Arthropoda
- Clade: Pancrustacea
- Class: Insecta
- Order: Coleoptera
- Suborder: Polyphaga
- Infraorder: Cucujiformia
- Family: Cerambycidae
- Genus: Dorcadion
- Species: D. quadrimaculatum

Binomial name
- Dorcadion quadrimaculatum Küster, 1848

Synonyms
- Maculatodorcadion quadrimaculatum (Küster, 1848)

Species of beetle

Dorcadion quadrimaculatum is a species of beetle in the family Cerambycidae. It was described by Küster in 1848. It is known from Turkey and Greece.

== Subspecies ==
- Dorcadion quadrimaculatum nodicorne Tournier, 1872
- Dorcadion quadrimaculatum quadrimaculatum Küster, 1848

== See also ==
- Dorcadion
