= Dorcadion ljubetense =

Scientific classification
- Kingdom: Animalia
- Phylum: Arthropoda
- Clade: Pancrustacea
- Class: Insecta
- Order: Coleoptera
- Suborder: Polyphaga
- Infraorder: Cucujiformia
- Family: Cerambycidae
- Genus: Dorcadion
- Species: D. ljubetense

Binomial name
- Dorcadion ljubetense Pic, 1909

Synonyms
- Dorcadion ljubetense Breit, 1928 nec Pic, 1909; Pedestredorcadion ljubetense (Pic) Sama, 2002

Species of beetle

Dorcadion ljubetense is a species of beetle in the family Cerambycidae. It was described by Maurice Pic in 1909. It is known from Macedonia.

== Subspecies ==
- Dorcadion ljubetense ljubetense Pic, 1909
- Dorcadion ljubetense peristeriense Breuning, 1962
