= Dorcadion peloponesium =

Scientific classification
- Kingdom: Animalia
- Phylum: Arthropoda
- Clade: Pancrustacea
- Class: Insecta
- Order: Coleoptera
- Suborder: Polyphaga
- Infraorder: Cucujiformia
- Family: Cerambycidae
- Genus: Dorcadion
- Species: D. peloponesium

Binomial name
- Dorcadion peloponesium Pic, 1902

Synonyms
- Dorcadion emgei var. peloponesium Pic, 1902; Dorcadion subjunctum Pic, 1904; Dorcadion weiratheri Pic, 1929; Pedestredorcadion subjunctum (Pic) Sama, 2002; Dorcadion glabrolineatum (Pic) Breuning, 1962

Species of beetle

Dorcadion peloponesium is a species of beetle in the family Cerambycidae. It was described by Maurice Pic in 1902. It is known from Greece.
