= Dorcadion lameeri =

Scientific classification
- Kingdom: Animalia
- Phylum: Arthropoda
- Clade: Pancrustacea
- Class: Insecta
- Order: Coleoptera
- Suborder: Polyphaga
- Infraorder: Cucujiformia
- Family: Cerambycidae
- Genus: Dorcadion
- Species: D. lameeri

Binomial name
- Dorcadion lameeri Théry, 1896

Synonyms
- Dorcadion lameeri m. discoimmaculatum Breuning, 1962; Dorcadion lameeri m. dorsodisjunctum Breuning, 1962; Dorcadion lameeri m. nigrofemoratum Breuning, 1962; Dorcadion lameeri m. posthumerovittatum Breuning, 1962

Species of beetle

Dorcadion lameeri is a species of beetle in the family Cerambycidae. It was described by Théry in 1896. It is known from Turkey.
