= Dorcadion gashtarovi =

Scientific classification
- Kingdom: Animalia
- Phylum: Arthropoda
- Clade: Pancrustacea
- Class: Insecta
- Order: Coleoptera
- Suborder: Polyphaga
- Infraorder: Cucujiformia
- Family: Cerambycidae
- Genus: Dorcadion
- Species: D. gashtarovi

Binomial name
- Dorcadion gashtarovi Sama, Dascalu & Pesarini, 2010

Synonyms
- Dorcadion divisum var. subinterruptum (Pic) Montandon, 1908; Dorcadion septemlineatum (Waltl) Balaci, 2000

Species of beetle

Dorcadion gashtarovi is a species of beetle in the family Cerambycidae. It was described by Sama, Dascalu and Pesarini in 2010. It is known from Bulgaria and Romania.

== See also ==
Dorcadion
