= Dorcadion smyrnense =

Scientific classification
- Kingdom: Animalia
- Phylum: Arthropoda
- Clade: Pancrustacea
- Class: Insecta
- Order: Coleoptera
- Suborder: Polyphaga
- Infraorder: Cucujiformia
- Family: Cerambycidae
- Genus: Dorcadion
- Species: D. smyrnense

Binomial name
- Dorcadion smyrnense (Linnaeus, 1757)

Synonyms
- Cerambyx smyrnensis Linnaeus, 1757; Dorcadion graecum Waltl, 1838; Dorcadion smyrnense m. bodemeyerianum Breuning, 1962; Lamia (Dorcadion) crux Billberg, 1817

Species of beetle

Dorcadion smyrnense is a species of beetle in the family Cerambycidae. It was described by Carl Linnaeus in 1757. It is known from Turkey.
