= Dorcadion iconiense =

Scientific classification
- Kingdom: Animalia
- Phylum: Arthropoda
- Clade: Pancrustacea
- Class: Insecta
- Order: Coleoptera
- Suborder: Polyphaga
- Infraorder: Cucujiformia
- Family: Cerambycidae
- Genus: Dorcadion
- Species: D. iconiense

Binomial name
- Dorcadion iconiense K. Daniel, 1901

Synonyms
- Dorcadion albicolle Breuning, 1943; Dorcadion muchei Breuning, 1962; Dorcadion parescherichi Breuning, 1966; Dorcadion semisetosum Jakovlev, 1901; Dorcadion subatritarse Breuning, 1966

Species of beetle

Dorcadion iconiense is a species of beetle in the family Cerambycidae. It was described by K. Daniel in 1901. It is known from Turkey.
