= Dorcadion ganglbaueri =

Scientific classification
- Kingdom: Animalia
- Phylum: Arthropoda
- Clade: Pancrustacea
- Class: Insecta
- Order: Coleoptera
- Suborder: Polyphaga
- Infraorder: Cucujiformia
- Family: Cerambycidae
- Genus: Dorcadion
- Species: D. ganglbaueri

Binomial name
- Dorcadion ganglbaueri Jakovlev, 1897

Species of beetle

Dorcadion ganglbaueri is a species of beetle in the family Cerambycidae. It was described by Jakovlev in 1897. It is known from Kazakhstan.

== Subspecies ==
- Dorcadion ganglbaueri ganglbaueri Jakovlev, 1897
- Dorcadion ganglbaueri paveli Danilevsky, 2013

== See also ==
Dorcadion
