= Dorcadion hampii =

Scientific classification
- Kingdom: Animalia
- Phylum: Arthropoda
- Clade: Pancrustacea
- Class: Insecta
- Order: Coleoptera
- Suborder: Polyphaga
- Infraorder: Cucujiformia
- Family: Cerambycidae
- Genus: Dorcadion
- Species: D. hampii

Binomial name
- Dorcadion hampii Mulsant & Rey, 1863

Synonyms
- Dorcadion hampei Breuning, 1962

Species of beetle

Dorcadion hampii is a species of beetle in the family Cerambycidae. It was described by Mulsant and Rey in 1863 from Turkey.

== Subspecies ==
- Dorcadion hampii aureovittatum Kraatz, 1873
- Dorcadion hampii hampii Mulsant & Rey, 1863
