= Dorcadion kaimakcalanum =

Scientific classification
- Kingdom: Animalia
- Phylum: Arthropoda
- Clade: Pancrustacea
- Class: Insecta
- Order: Coleoptera
- Suborder: Polyphaga
- Infraorder: Cucujiformia
- Family: Cerambycidae
- Genus: Dorcadion
- Species: D. kaimakcalanum

Binomial name
- Dorcadion kaimakcalanum Jurecek, 1929

Synonyms
- Pedestredorcadion kaimakcalanum (Jurecek, 1929)

Species of beetle

Dorcadion kaimakcalanum is a species of beetle in the family Cerambycidae. It was described by Jurecek in 1929. It is known from Greece and Macedonia. It contains the varietas Dorcadion kaimakcalanum var. jureceki.
