= Dorcadion shestopalovi =

Scientific classification
- Kingdom: Animalia
- Phylum: Arthropoda
- Clade: Pancrustacea
- Class: Insecta
- Order: Coleoptera
- Suborder: Polyphaga
- Infraorder: Cucujiformia
- Family: Cerambycidae
- Genus: Dorcadion
- Species: D. shestopalovi

Binomial name
- Dorcadion shestopalovi Danilevsky, 1993

Species of beetle

Dorcadion shestopalovi is a species of beetle in the family Cerambycidae. It was described by Mikhail Leontievich Danilevsky in 1993. It is known from the Caucasus.No subspecies are listed.

The larvae of this beetle, commonly called the mother head borer, bore into wood, where it can cause extensive damage to live or felled trees.
