= Dorcadion johannisfranci =

Scientific classification
- Kingdom: Animalia
- Phylum: Arthropoda
- Clade: Pancrustacea
- Class: Insecta
- Order: Coleoptera
- Suborder: Polyphaga
- Infraorder: Cucujiformia
- Family: Cerambycidae
- Genus: Dorcadion
- Species: D. johannisfranci

Binomial name
- Dorcadion johannisfranci Pesarini & Sabbadini, 2007

Synonyms
- Dorcadion obsoletum (Kraatz) Breuning, 1962

Species of beetle

Dorcadion johannisfranci is a species of beetle in the family Cerambycidae. It was described by Pesarini and Sabbadini in 2007. It is known from Greece and Turkey.

== See also ==
- Dorcadion
