= Dorcadion pararufipenne =

Scientific classification
- Kingdom: Animalia
- Phylum: Arthropoda
- Clade: Pancrustacea
- Class: Insecta
- Order: Coleoptera
- Suborder: Polyphaga
- Infraorder: Cucujiformia
- Family: Cerambycidae
- Genus: Dorcadion
- Species: D. pararufipenne

Binomial name
- Dorcadion pararufipenne Braun, 1976

Species of beetle

Dorcadion pararufipenne is a species of beetle in the family Cerambycidae. It was described by Walter Braun in 1976. It is known from Turkey.

== Subspecies ==
- Dorcadion pararufipenne pararufipenne Braun, 1976
- Dorcadion pararufipenne rassei Braun, 1976
