= Dorcadion ribbei =

Scientific classification
- Kingdom: Animalia
- Phylum: Arthropoda
- Clade: Pancrustacea
- Class: Insecta
- Order: Coleoptera
- Suborder: Polyphaga
- Infraorder: Cucujiformia
- Family: Cerambycidae
- Genus: Dorcadion
- Species: D. ribbei

Binomial name
- Dorcadion ribbei Kraatz, 1878

Species of beetle

Dorcadion ribbei is a species of beetle in the family Cerambycidae. It was described by Kraatz in 1878.

== Subspecies ==
- Dorcadion ribbei bobrovi Danilevsky, 2001
- Dorcadion ribbei ribbei Kraatz, 1878

== See also ==
Dorcadion
