= Dorcadion sodale =

Scientific classification
- Kingdom: Animalia
- Phylum: Arthropoda
- Clade: Pancrustacea
- Class: Insecta
- Order: Coleoptera
- Suborder: Polyphaga
- Infraorder: Cucujiformia
- Family: Cerambycidae
- Genus: Dorcadion
- Species: D. sodale

Binomial name
- Dorcadion sodale Hampe, 1852

Species of beetle

Dorcadion sodale is a species of beetle in the family Cerambycidae. It was described by Hampe in 1852. It is known from Georgia and Turkey.

== Subspecies ==
- Dorcadion sodale var. rosti Pic, 1900
- Dorcadion sodale var. trapesunticum Breuning, 1946
