= Dorcadion stephaniae =

Scientific classification
- Kingdom: Animalia
- Phylum: Arthropoda
- Clade: Pancrustacea
- Class: Insecta
- Order: Coleoptera
- Suborder: Polyphaga
- Infraorder: Cucujiformia
- Family: Cerambycidae
- Genus: Dorcadion
- Species: D. stephaniae

Binomial name
- Dorcadion stephaniae Pesarini & Sabbadini, 2003

Synonyms
- Pedestredorcadion stephaniae (Pesarini & Sabbadini, 2003)

Species of beetle

Dorcadion stephaniae is a species of beetle in the family Cerambycidae. It was described by Pesarini and Sabbadini in 2003. It is known from Greece.
