= Dorcadion globithorax =

Scientific classification
- Kingdom: Animalia
- Phylum: Arthropoda
- Clade: Pancrustacea
- Class: Insecta
- Order: Coleoptera
- Suborder: Polyphaga
- Infraorder: Cucujiformia
- Family: Cerambycidae
- Genus: Dorcadion
- Species: D. globithorax

Binomial name
- Dorcadion globithorax Jakovlev, 1895

Synonyms
- Dorcadion staudingeri Pic, 1900

Species of beetle

Dorcadion globithorax is a species of beetle in the family Cerambycidae. It was described by Jakovlev in 1895. It is known from Kyrgyzstan and Kazakhstan.

== See also ==
- Dorcadion
