= Dorcadion meschniggi =

Scientific classification
- Kingdom: Animalia
- Phylum: Arthropoda
- Clade: Pancrustacea
- Class: Insecta
- Order: Coleoptera
- Suborder: Polyphaga
- Infraorder: Cucujiformia
- Family: Cerambycidae
- Genus: Dorcadion
- Species: D. meschniggi

Binomial name
- Dorcadion meschniggi Breit, 1928

Synonyms
- Dorcadion olympianum Meschnigg, 1947; Pedestredorcadion meschniggi (Breit) Sama, 2002

Species of beetle

Dorcadion meschniggi is a species of beetle in the family Cerambycidae. It was described by Breit in 1928. It is known from Greece.
