= Dorcadion hypocritellum =

Scientific classification
- Kingdom: Animalia
- Phylum: Arthropoda
- Clade: Pancrustacea
- Class: Insecta
- Order: Coleoptera
- Suborder: Polyphaga
- Infraorder: Cucujiformia
- Family: Cerambycidae
- Genus: Dorcadion
- Species: D. hypocritellum

Binomial name
- Dorcadion hypocritellum Breuning, 1958

Synonyms
- Dorcadion hypocrita Plavilstshikov, 1937 nec Mulsant, 1863

Species of beetle

Dorcadion hypocritellum is a species of beetle in the family Cerambycidae. It was described by Stephan von Breuning in 1958.
