= Dorcadion sinuatevittatum =

Scientific classification
- Kingdom: Animalia
- Phylum: Arthropoda
- Clade: Pancrustacea
- Class: Insecta
- Order: Coleoptera
- Suborder: Polyphaga
- Infraorder: Cucujiformia
- Family: Cerambycidae
- Genus: Dorcadion
- Species: D. sinuatevittatum

Binomial name
- Dorcadion sinuatevittatum Pic, 1937

Synonyms
- Dorcadion brevemediolineatum Pic, 1942

Species of beetle

Dorcadion sinuatevittatum is a species of beetle in the family Cerambycidae. It was described by Maurice Pic in 1937. It is known from Turkey.
