= Dorcadion turkestanicum =

Scientific classification
- Kingdom: Animalia
- Phylum: Arthropoda
- Clade: Pancrustacea
- Class: Insecta
- Order: Coleoptera
- Suborder: Polyphaga
- Infraorder: Cucujiformia
- Family: Cerambycidae
- Genus: Dorcadion
- Species: D. turkestanicum

Binomial name
- Dorcadion turkestanicum Kraatz, 1881

Synonyms
- ?Dorcadion samarkandiae Breuning, 1946

Species of beetle

Dorcadion turkestanicum is a species of beetle in the family Cerambycidae. It was described by Kraatz in 1881. It is known from China and Kazakhstan.
