= Dorcadion lativittis =

Scientific classification
- Kingdom: Animalia
- Phylum: Arthropoda
- Clade: Pancrustacea
- Class: Insecta
- Order: Coleoptera
- Suborder: Polyphaga
- Infraorder: Cucujiformia
- Family: Cerambycidae
- Genus: Dorcadion
- Species: D. lativittis

Binomial name
- Dorcadion lativittis Kraatz, 1878

Synonyms
- Politodorcadion lativittis (Kraatz, 1878)

Species of beetle

Dorcadion lativittis is a species of beetle in the family Cerambycidae. It was described by Kraatz in 1878.

== See also ==
Dorcadion
