= Dorcadion condensatum =

Scientific classification
- Kingdom: Animalia
- Phylum: Arthropoda
- Clade: Pancrustacea
- Class: Insecta
- Order: Coleoptera
- Suborder: Polyphaga
- Infraorder: Cucujiformia
- Family: Cerambycidae
- Genus: Dorcadion
- Species: D. condensatum

Binomial name
- Dorcadion condensatum Küster, 1852

Synonyms
- Pedestredorcadion condensatum (Küster, 1852)

Species of beetle

Dorcadion condensatum is a species of beetle in the family Cerambycidae. It was described by Küster in 1852. It is known from Turkey and Bulgaria.
