= Dorcadion wagneri =

Scientific classification
- Kingdom: Animalia
- Phylum: Arthropoda
- Clade: Pancrustacea
- Class: Insecta
- Order: Coleoptera
- Suborder: Polyphaga
- Infraorder: Cucujiformia
- Family: Cerambycidae
- Genus: Dorcadion
- Species: D. wagneri

Binomial name
- Dorcadion wagneri Küster, 1846

Synonyms
- Dorcadion solyzinosum Pic, 1942

Species of beetle

Dorcadion wagneri is a species of beetle in the family Cerambycidae. It was described by Küster in 1846. It is known from Turkey, Iran, and Armenia.
