= Dorcadion bithyniense =

Scientific classification
- Kingdom: Animalia
- Phylum: Arthropoda
- Clade: Pancrustacea
- Class: Insecta
- Order: Coleoptera
- Suborder: Polyphaga
- Infraorder: Cucujiformia
- Family: Cerambycidae
- Genus: Dorcadion
- Species: D. bithyniense

Binomial name
- Dorcadion bithyniense Chevrolat, 1856

Synonyms
- Dorcadion serotinum Thomson, 1865

Species of beetle

Dorcadion bithyniense is a species of beetle in the family Cerambycidae. It was described by Chevrolat in 1856. It is known from Turkey.
