= Dorcadion drusum =

Scientific classification
- Kingdom: Animalia
- Phylum: Arthropoda
- Clade: Pancrustacea
- Class: Insecta
- Order: Coleoptera
- Suborder: Polyphaga
- Infraorder: Cucujiformia
- Family: Cerambycidae
- Genus: Dorcadion
- Species: D. drusum

Binomial name
- Dorcadion drusum Chevrolat, 1870

Synonyms
- Dorcadion libanoticum Kraatz, 1873

Species of beetle

Dorcadion drusum is a species of beetle in the family Cerambycidae. It was described by Chevrolat in 1870. It is known from Syria and Lebanon.
