= Dorcadion insulare =

Scientific classification
- Kingdom: Animalia
- Phylum: Arthropoda
- Clade: Pancrustacea
- Class: Insecta
- Order: Coleoptera
- Suborder: Polyphaga
- Infraorder: Cucujiformia
- Family: Cerambycidae
- Genus: Dorcadion
- Species: D. insulare

Binomial name
- Dorcadion insulare Kraatz, 1883

Synonyms
- Pedestredorcadion insulare (Kraatz) Sama, 2002

Species of beetle

Dorcadion insulare is a species of beetle in the family Cerambycidae. It was described by Kraatz in 1883. It is known from Greece.
