= Dorcadion nurense =

Scientific classification
- Kingdom: Animalia
- Phylum: Arthropoda
- Clade: Pancrustacea
- Class: Insecta
- Order: Coleoptera
- Suborder: Polyphaga
- Infraorder: Cucujiformia
- Family: Cerambycidae
- Genus: Dorcadion
- Species: D. nurense

Binomial name
- Dorcadion nurense Danilevsky & Murzin in 2009

Species of beetle

Dorcadion nurense is a species of beetle in the family Cerambycidae. It was described by Mikhail Leontievich Danilevsky and Sergey Murzin in 2009. It is known from Iran.
