= Dorcadion parallelum =

Scientific classification
- Kingdom: Animalia
- Phylum: Arthropoda
- Clade: Pancrustacea
- Class: Insecta
- Order: Coleoptera
- Suborder: Polyphaga
- Infraorder: Cucujiformia
- Family: Cerambycidae
- Genus: Dorcadion
- Species: D. parallelum

Binomial name
- Dorcadion parallelum Küster, 1847

Species of beetle

Dorcadion parallelum is a species of beetle in the family Cerambycidae. It was described by Küster in 1847. It is known from Palestine, Syria, and Turkey.

== See also ==
Dorcadion
