= Dorcadion tibiale =

Scientific classification
- Kingdom: Animalia
- Phylum: Arthropoda
- Clade: Pancrustacea
- Class: Insecta
- Order: Coleoptera
- Suborder: Polyphaga
- Infraorder: Cucujiformia
- Family: Cerambycidae
- Genus: Dorcadion
- Species: D. tibiale

Binomial name
- Dorcadion tibiale Jakovlev, 1890

Species of beetle

Dorcadion tibiale is a species of beetle in the family Cerambycidae. It was described by Jakovlev in 1890. It is known from China and Central Asia.

== See also ==
- Dorcadion
