= Dorcadion toropovi =

Scientific classification
- Kingdom: Animalia
- Phylum: Arthropoda
- Clade: Pancrustacea
- Class: Insecta
- Order: Coleoptera
- Suborder: Polyphaga
- Infraorder: Cucujiformia
- Family: Cerambycidae
- Genus: Dorcadion
- Species: D. toropovi

Binomial name
- Dorcadion toropovi Danilevsky, 1999

Species of beetle

Dorcadion toropovi is a species of beetle in the family Cerambycidae. It was described by Mikhail Leontievich Danilevsky in 1999. It is known from Kyrgyzstan.
