= Dorcadion nobile =

Scientific classification
- Kingdom: Animalia
- Phylum: Arthropoda
- Clade: Pancrustacea
- Class: Insecta
- Order: Coleoptera
- Suborder: Polyphaga
- Infraorder: Cucujiformia
- Family: Cerambycidae
- Genus: Dorcadion
- Species: D. nobile

Binomial name
- Dorcadion nobile Hampe, 1852

Species of beetle

Dorcadion nobile is a species of beetle in the family Cerambycidae. It was described by Hampe in 1852. It is known from Turkey, and is believed to also be found in Azerbaijan and Georgia.
