= Dorcadion bodemeyeri =

Scientific classification
- Kingdom: Animalia
- Phylum: Arthropoda
- Clade: Pancrustacea
- Class: Insecta
- Order: Coleoptera
- Suborder: Polyphaga
- Infraorder: Cucujiformia
- Family: Cerambycidae
- Genus: Dorcadion
- Species: D. bodemeyeri

Binomial name
- Dorcadion bodemeyeri K. Daniel, 1901

Species of beetle

Dorcadion bodemeyeri is a species of beetle in the family Cerambycidae. It was described by K. Daniel in 1901. It is known from Turkey.
