= Dorcadion bouilloni =

Scientific classification
- Kingdom: Animalia
- Phylum: Arthropoda
- Clade: Pancrustacea
- Class: Insecta
- Order: Coleoptera
- Suborder: Polyphaga
- Infraorder: Cucujiformia
- Family: Cerambycidae
- Genus: Dorcadion
- Species: D. bouilloni

Binomial name
- Dorcadion bouilloni Breuning & Ruspoli, 1975

Species of beetle

Dorcadion bouilloni is a species of beetle in the family Cerambycidae. It was described by Stephan von Breuning and Ruspoli and 1975.
