= Dorcadion daratshitshagi =

Scientific classification
- Kingdom: Animalia
- Phylum: Arthropoda
- Clade: Pancrustacea
- Class: Insecta
- Order: Coleoptera
- Suborder: Polyphaga
- Infraorder: Cucujiformia
- Family: Cerambycidae
- Genus: Dorcadion
- Species: D. daratshitshagi

Binomial name
- Dorcadion daratshitshagi Suvorov, 1915

Species of beetle

Dorcadion daratshitshagi is a species of beetle in the family Cerambycidae. It was described by Suvorov in 1915. It is known from Armenia.
