= Dorcadion lineatopunctatum =

Scientific classification
- Kingdom: Animalia
- Phylum: Arthropoda
- Clade: Pancrustacea
- Class: Insecta
- Order: Coleoptera
- Suborder: Polyphaga
- Infraorder: Cucujiformia
- Family: Cerambycidae
- Genus: Dorcadion
- Species: D. lineatopunctatum

Binomial name
- Dorcadion lineatopunctatum Breuning, 1944

Species of beetle

Dorcadion lineatopunctatum is a species of beetle in the family Cerambycidae. It was described by Stephan von Breuning in 1944.
