= Dorcadion banjkovskyi =

Scientific classification
- Kingdom: Animalia
- Phylum: Arthropoda
- Clade: Pancrustacea
- Class: Insecta
- Order: Coleoptera
- Suborder: Polyphaga
- Infraorder: Cucujiformia
- Family: Cerambycidae
- Genus: Dorcadion
- Species: D. banjkovskyi

Binomial name
- Dorcadion banjkovskyi Plavilstshikov, 1958

Species of beetle

Dorcadion banjkovskyi is a species of beetle in the family Cerambycidae. It was described by Plavilstshikov in 1958.
