= Dorcadion multimaculatum =

Scientific classification
- Kingdom: Animalia
- Phylum: Arthropoda
- Clade: Pancrustacea
- Class: Insecta
- Order: Coleoptera
- Suborder: Polyphaga
- Infraorder: Cucujiformia
- Family: Cerambycidae
- Genus: Dorcadion
- Species: D. multimaculatum

Binomial name
- Dorcadion multimaculatum Pic, 1932

Species of beetle

Dorcadion multimaculatum is a species of beetle in the family Cerambycidae. It was described by Maurice Pic in 1932. It is known from Turkey.
