= Dorcadion discomaculatum =

Scientific classification
- Kingdom: Animalia
- Phylum: Arthropoda
- Clade: Pancrustacea
- Class: Insecta
- Order: Coleoptera
- Suborder: Polyphaga
- Infraorder: Cucujiformia
- Family: Cerambycidae
- Genus: Dorcadion
- Species: D. discomaculatum

Binomial name
- Dorcadion discomaculatum Pic, 1905

Species of beetle

Dorcadion discomaculatum is a species of beetle in the family Cerambycidae. It was described by Maurice Pic in 1905. It is known from Iran.
