= Dorcadion cineriferum =

Scientific classification
- Kingdom: Animalia
- Phylum: Arthropoda
- Clade: Pancrustacea
- Class: Insecta
- Order: Coleoptera
- Suborder: Polyphaga
- Infraorder: Cucujiformia
- Family: Cerambycidae
- Genus: Dorcadion
- Species: D. cineriferum

Binomial name
- Dorcadion cineriferum Suvorov, 1909

Species of beetle

Dorcadion cineriferum is a species of beetle in the family Cerambycidae. It was described by Suvorov in 1909. It is known from the Caucasus.
