= Dorcadion alexandris =

Scientific classification
- Kingdom: Animalia
- Phylum: Arthropoda
- Clade: Pancrustacea
- Class: Insecta
- Order: Coleoptera
- Suborder: Polyphaga
- Infraorder: Cucujiformia
- Family: Cerambycidae
- Genus: Dorcadion
- Species: D. alexandris

Binomial name
- Dorcadion alexandris Pic, 1900

Species of beetle

Dorcadion alexandris is a species of beetle in the family Cerambycidae. It was described by Maurice Pic in 1900.

== See also ==
- Dorcadion
