= Dorcadion boucardi =

Scientific classification
- Kingdom: Animalia
- Phylum: Arthropoda
- Clade: Pancrustacea
- Class: Insecta
- Order: Coleoptera
- Suborder: Polyphaga
- Infraorder: Cucujiformia
- Family: Cerambycidae
- Genus: Dorcadion
- Species: D. boucardi

Binomial name
- Dorcadion boucardi Pic, 1942

Species of beetle

Dorcadion boucardi is a species of beetle in the family Cerambycidae. It was described by Maurice Pic in 1942. It is known from Syria.
