= Dorcadion kuldschanum =

Scientific classification
- Kingdom: Animalia
- Phylum: Arthropoda
- Clade: Pancrustacea
- Class: Insecta
- Order: Coleoptera
- Suborder: Polyphaga
- Infraorder: Cucujiformia
- Family: Cerambycidae
- Genus: Dorcadion
- Species: D. kuldschanum

Binomial name
- Dorcadion kuldschanum Pic, 1908

Species of beetle

Dorcadion kuldschanum is a species of beetle in the family Cerambycidae. It was described by Maurice Pic in 1908.
