= Dorcadion steineri =

Scientific classification
- Kingdom: Animalia
- Phylum: Arthropoda
- Clade: Pancrustacea
- Class: Insecta
- Order: Coleoptera
- Suborder: Polyphaga
- Infraorder: Cucujiformia
- Family: Cerambycidae
- Genus: Dorcadion
- Species: D. steineri

Binomial name
- Dorcadion steineri Holzschuh, 1977

Species of beetle

Dorcadion steineri is a species of beetle in the family Cerambycidae. It was described by Holzschuh in 1977. It is known from Turkey.
