= Dorcadion maradense =

Scientific classification
- Kingdom: Animalia
- Phylum: Arthropoda
- Clade: Pancrustacea
- Class: Insecta
- Order: Coleoptera
- Suborder: Polyphaga
- Infraorder: Cucujiformia
- Family: Cerambycidae
- Genus: Dorcadion
- Species: D. maradense

Binomial name
- Dorcadion maradense Holzschuh, 2007

Species of beetle

Dorcadion maradense is a species of beetle in the family Cerambycidae. It was described by Holzschuh in 2007. It is known from Iran.
