= Dorcadion karsense =

Scientific classification
- Kingdom: Animalia
- Phylum: Arthropoda
- Clade: Pancrustacea
- Class: Insecta
- Order: Coleoptera
- Suborder: Polyphaga
- Infraorder: Cucujiformia
- Family: Cerambycidae
- Genus: Dorcadion
- Species: D. karsense

Binomial name
- Dorcadion karsense Suvorov, 1916

Species of beetle

Dorcadion karsense is a species of beetle in the family Cerambycidae. It was described by Suvorov in 1916. It is known from Turkey.
