= Dorcadion sonjae =

Scientific classification
- Kingdom: Animalia
- Phylum: Arthropoda
- Clade: Pancrustacea
- Class: Insecta
- Order: Coleoptera
- Suborder: Polyphaga
- Infraorder: Cucujiformia
- Family: Cerambycidae
- Genus: Dorcadion
- Species: D. sonjae

Binomial name
- Dorcadion sonjae Peks, 1993

Species of beetle

Dorcadion sonjae is a species of beetle in the family Cerambycidae. It was described by Peks in 1993. It is known from Turkey.
