= Phytoecia drurei =

Scientific classification
- Kingdom: Animalia
- Phylum: Arthropoda
- Class: Insecta
- Order: Coleoptera
- Suborder: Polyphaga
- Infraorder: Cucujiformia
- Family: Cerambycidae
- Genus: Phytoecia
- Species: P. drurei

Binomial name
- Phytoecia drurei Pic, 1909

Synonyms
- Conizonia drurei (Pic, 1909); Coptosia drurei (Pic, 1909)

Species of beetle

Phytoecia drurei is a species of beetle in the family Cerambycidae. It was described by Maurice Pic in 1909.
