= Phytoecia algerica =

Scientific classification
- Domain: Eukaryota
- Kingdom: Animalia
- Phylum: Arthropoda
- Class: Insecta
- Order: Coleoptera
- Suborder: Polyphaga
- Infraorder: Cucujiformia
- Family: Cerambycidae
- Genus: Phytoecia
- Species: P. algerica

Binomial name
- Phytoecia algerica Desbrochers, 1870

Synonyms
- Phytoecia algirica (Desbrochers) Villiers, 1946; Phytaecia nigritarsis Chevrolat, 1882

Species of beetle

Phytoecia algerica is a species of beetle in the family Cerambycidae. It was described by Desbrochers in 1870. It is known from Morocco, Algeria, and Spain. It feeds on Artemisia arborescens.

== Varietas ==
- Phytaecia algerica var. nigroanalis Breuning, 1947
- Phytaecia algerica var. borchmanni Heyrovsky, 1958
- Phytoecia algerica var. rufotibialis Pic, 1926
- Phytoecia algerica var. rabatensis Pic, 1945
