= Phytoecia bithynensis =

Scientific classification
- Domain: Eukaryota
- Kingdom: Animalia
- Phylum: Arthropoda
- Class: Insecta
- Order: Coleoptera
- Suborder: Polyphaga
- Infraorder: Cucujiformia
- Family: Cerambycidae
- Genus: Phytoecia
- Species: P. bithynensis

Binomial name
- Phytoecia bithynensis Ganglbauer, 1884

Synonyms
- Coptosia bithynensis (Ganglbauer, 1884); Coptosia bithyniensis Tozlu, Rejzek & Özbek, 2003; Conizonia (Coptosia) bithyniensis (Ganglbauer) Breuning, 1954 (misspelling); Phytoecia bithyniensis (Ganglbauer) Breuning, 1954 (misspelling)

Species of beetle

Phytoecia bithynensis is a species of beetle in the family Cerambycidae. It was first described by Ganglbauer in 1884. It is known from Bulgaria, Turkey, Armenia, and possibly Romania.
