= Phytoecia povolnyi =

Scientific classification
- Domain: Eukaryota
- Kingdom: Animalia
- Phylum: Arthropoda
- Class: Insecta
- Order: Coleoptera
- Suborder: Polyphaga
- Infraorder: Cucujiformia
- Family: Cerambycidae
- Genus: Phytoecia
- Species: P. povolnyi

Binomial name
- Phytoecia povolnyi Heyrovsky, 1971

Species of beetle

Phytoecia povolnyi is a species of beetle in the family Cerambycidae. It was described by Leopold Heyrovský in 1971. It is known from Afghanistan.
