= Phytoecia manicata =

Scientific classification
- Domain: Eukaryota
- Kingdom: Animalia
- Phylum: Arthropoda
- Class: Insecta
- Order: Coleoptera
- Suborder: Polyphaga
- Infraorder: Cucujiformia
- Family: Cerambycidae
- Genus: Phytoecia
- Species: P. manicata

Binomial name
- Phytoecia manicata Reiche & Saulcy, 1858

Species of beetle

Phytoecia manicata is a species of beetle in the family Cerambycidae. It was described by Reiche and Saulcy in 1858. It is known from Jordan, Syria, Lebanon, Turkey and Palestine.
