= Phytoecia pauliraputii =

Scientific classification
- Domain: Eukaryota
- Kingdom: Animalia
- Phylum: Arthropoda
- Class: Insecta
- Order: Coleoptera
- Suborder: Polyphaga
- Infraorder: Cucujiformia
- Family: Cerambycidae
- Genus: Phytoecia
- Species: P. pauliraputii

Binomial name
- Phytoecia pauliraputii (Sama, 1993)

Synonyms
- Neomusaria pauliraputii Sama, 1993

Species of beetle

Phytoecia pauliraputii is a species of beetle in the family Cerambycidae. It was described by Sama in 1993. It is known from Turkey.
