= Phytoecia ferrugata =

Scientific classification
- Domain: Eukaryota
- Kingdom: Animalia
- Phylum: Arthropoda
- Class: Insecta
- Order: Coleoptera
- Suborder: Polyphaga
- Infraorder: Cucujiformia
- Family: Cerambycidae
- Genus: Phytoecia
- Species: P. ferrugata

Binomial name
- Phytoecia ferrugata Ganglbauer, 1884

Synonyms
- Helladia ferrugata (Ganglbauer) Pic, 1903

Species of beetle

Phytoecia ferrugata is a species of beetle in the family Cerambycidae. It was described by Ganglbauer in 1884.

== Subspecies ==
- Phytoecia ferrugata ferrugata Ganglbauer, 1884
- Phytoecia ferrugata dilaticollis Pic, 1900
