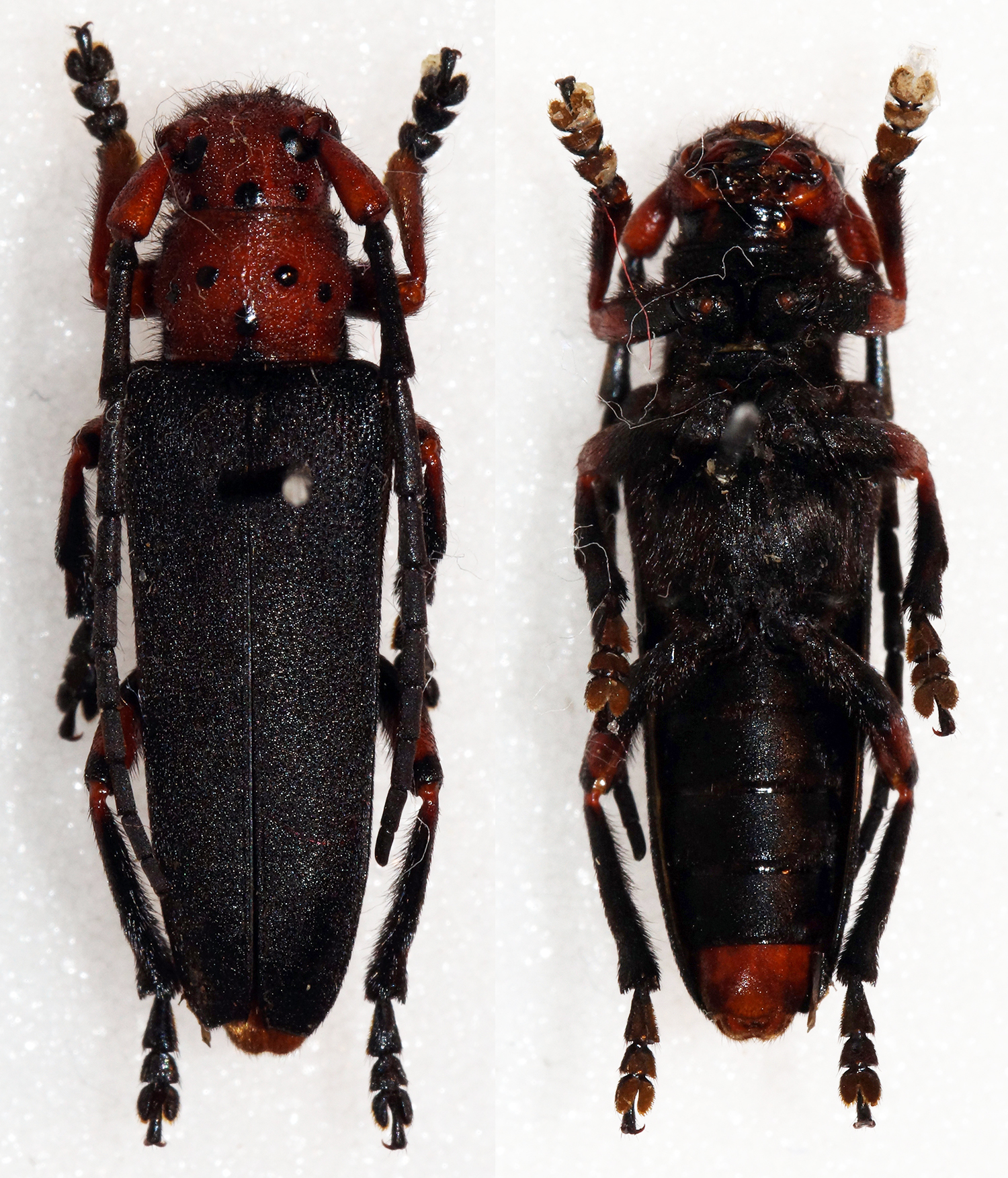
- Phytoecia p. puncticollis

Scientific classification
- Domain: Eukaryota
- Kingdom: Animalia
- Phylum: Arthropoda
- Class: Insecta
- Order: Coleoptera
- Suborder: Polyphaga
- Infraorder: Cucujiformia
- Family: Cerambycidae
- Genus: Phytoecia
- Species: P. puncticollis

Binomial name
- Phytoecia puncticollis Faldermann, 1837

Synonyms
- Phytoecia puncticollis puncticollis Faldermann, 1837; Musaria puncticollis (Faldermann) Pic, 1917; Musaria puncticollis puncticollis (Faldermann, 1837)

= Phytoecia puncticollis =

Species of beetle

Phytoecia puncticollis is a species of beetle in the family Cerambycidae. It was described by Faldermann in 1837. It is known from Russia, Azerbaijan, Georgia, Iraq, Armenia, Turkey, Iran, and Turkmenistan. It feeds on Eryngium billardierei.

== Varietas ==
- Phytoecia puncticollis var. parvomaculata Plavilstshikov, 1929
- Phytoecia puncticollis var. bimaculata Plavilstshikov, 1929
- Phytoecia puncticollis var. bistrimaculata Plavilstshikov, 1932
- Phytoecia puncticollis var. diversicollis Pic, 1917
- Phytoecia puncticollis var. escalerai Plavilstshikov, 1929
- Phytoecia puncticollis var. immaculata Plavilstshikov, 1929
- Phytoecia puncticollis var. heydeni Pic, 1952
- Phytoecia puncticollis var. ignatii Plavilstshikov, 1929
- Phytoecia puncticollis var. occipitalis Plavilstshikov, 1929
- Phytoecia puncticollis var. infrequens Plavilstshikov, 1929
- Phytoecia puncticollis var. mardiniensis Heyden, 1894
- Phytoecia puncticollis var. aladaghensis Reitter, 1906
- Phytoecia puncticollis var. nigrifrons Breuning, 1951
- Phytoecia puncticollis var. nigroscapus Breuning, 1951
- Phytoecia puncticollis var. octopunctata Pic, 1952
- Phytoecia puncticollis var. trimaculata Pic, 1917
- Phytoecia puncticollis var. persica Ganglbauer, 1883
- Phytoecia puncticollis var. quadrimaculata Plavilstshikov, 1932
- Phytoecia puncticollis var. verticeuninotata Pic, 1952
- Phytoecia puncticollis var. quinquepuncticollis Pic, 1952
- Phytoecia puncticollis var. similis Plavilstshikov, 1929
- Phytoecia puncticollis var. stygia Ganglbauer, 1883
- Phytoecia puncticollis var. transitora Breuning, 1951
- Phytoecia puncticollis var. quadripunctata Breuning, 1951
- Phytoecia puncticollis var. trinoticollis Pic, 1952
- Phytoecia puncticollis var. unicoloricollis Plavilstshikov, 1932
- Phytoecia puncticollis var. unisignata Plavilstshikov, 1932
- Phytoecia puncticollis var. subtypica Plavilstshikov, 1932
- Phytoecia puncticollis var. gamborensis Pic, 1917
