= Phytoecia latepubens =

Scientific classification
- Kingdom: Animalia
- Phylum: Arthropoda
- Class: Insecta
- Order: Coleoptera
- Suborder: Polyphaga
- Infraorder: Cucujiformia
- Family: Cerambycidae
- Genus: Phytoecia
- Species: P. latepubens

Binomial name
- Phytoecia latepubens (Pic, 1926)

Synonyms
- Phytoecia (Neomusaria) merkli latepubens (Pic) Breuning, 1951; Helladia merkli var. latepubens Pic, 1926

Species of beetle

Phytoecia latepubens is a species of beetle in the family Cerambycidae. It was described by Maurice Pic in 1926, originally under the genus Helladia. It is known from Syria. It contains the varietas Phytoecia latepubens var. alepensis.
