= Phytoecia insignis =

Scientific classification
- Domain: Eukaryota
- Kingdom: Animalia
- Phylum: Arthropoda
- Class: Insecta
- Order: Coleoptera
- Suborder: Polyphaga
- Infraorder: Cucujiformia
- Family: Cerambycidae
- Genus: Phytoecia
- Species: P. insignis

Binomial name
- Phytoecia insignis (Aurivillius, 1914)

Synonyms
- Blepisanis insignis Aurivillius, 1914

Species of beetle

Phytoecia insignis is a species of beetle in the family Cerambycidae. It was described by Per Olof Christopher Aurivillius in 1914, originally under the genus Blepisanis. It is known from Malawi, the Democratic Republic of the Congo, and Tanzania.
