= Phytoecia incallosa =

Scientific classification
- Kingdom: Animalia
- Phylum: Arthropoda
- Class: Insecta
- Order: Coleoptera
- Suborder: Polyphaga
- Infraorder: Cucujiformia
- Family: Cerambycidae
- Genus: Phytoecia
- Species: P. incallosa

Binomial name
- Phytoecia incallosa (Breuning, 1950)

Synonyms
- Blepisanis incallosa Breuning, 1950

Species of beetle

Phytoecia incallosa is a species of beetle in the family Cerambycidae. It was described by Stephan von Breuning in 1950. It is known from Angola, originally under the genus Blepisanis.
