= Phytoecia gianassoi =

Scientific classification
- Domain: Eukaryota
- Kingdom: Animalia
- Phylum: Arthropoda
- Class: Insecta
- Order: Coleoptera
- Suborder: Polyphaga
- Infraorder: Cucujiformia
- Family: Cerambycidae
- Genus: Phytoecia
- Species: P. gianassoi

Binomial name
- Phytoecia gianassoi (Sama, 2007)

Synonyms
- Coptosia gianassoi Sama, 2007; Coptosia (Coptosia) gianassoi Löbl & Smetana, 2010

Species of beetle

Phytoecia gianassoi is a species of beetle in the family Cerambycidae. It was described by Sama in 2007 and later reclassified to the subgenus Coptosia within the genus Phytoecia.
