= Phytoecia chinensis =

Scientific classification
- Kingdom: Animalia
- Phylum: Arthropoda
- Class: Insecta
- Order: Coleoptera
- Suborder: Polyphaga
- Infraorder: Cucujiformia
- Family: Cerambycidae
- Genus: Phytoecia
- Species: P. chinensis

Binomial name
- Phytoecia chinensis Breuning, 1943

Synonyms
- Opsilia chinensis (Breuning, 1943)

Species of beetle

Phytoecia chinensis is a species of beetle in the family Cerambycidae. It was described by Stephan von Breuning in 1943.
