= Phytoecia haroldi =

Scientific classification
- Domain: Eukaryota
- Kingdom: Animalia
- Phylum: Arthropoda
- Class: Insecta
- Order: Coleoptera
- Suborder: Polyphaga
- Infraorder: Cucujiformia
- Family: Cerambycidae
- Genus: Phytoecia
- Species: P. haroldi

Binomial name
- Phytoecia haroldi (Fahraeus, 1872)

Synonyms
- Phytoecia haroldi m. unimaculata Sudre & Téocchi, 2002; Saperda haroldi Fahraeus, 1872; Oberea kaessneri Distant, 1898

Species of beetle

Phytoecia haroldi is a species of beetle in the family Cerambycidae. It was described by Fahraeus in 1872. It is known from Malawi.
