= Phytoecia cephalotes =

Scientific classification
- Domain: Eukaryota
- Kingdom: Animalia
- Phylum: Arthropoda
- Class: Insecta
- Order: Coleoptera
- Suborder: Polyphaga
- Infraorder: Cucujiformia
- Family: Cerambycidae
- Genus: Phytoecia
- Species: P. cephalotes

Binomial name
- Phytoecia cephalotes Küster, 1846

Synonyms
- Musaria cephalotes (Küster)

Species of beetle

Phytoecia cephalotes is a species of beetle in the family Cerambycidae. It was described by Küster in 1846. It is known from Italy, Greece, Croatia, Bosnia and Herzegovina, and Slovenia. It feeds on Trinia dalechampii.
