= Phytoecia tatyanae =

Scientific classification
- Domain: Eukaryota
- Kingdom: Animalia
- Phylum: Arthropoda
- Class: Insecta
- Order: Coleoptera
- Suborder: Polyphaga
- Infraorder: Cucujiformia
- Family: Cerambycidae
- Genus: Phytoecia
- Species: P. tatyanae

Binomial name
- Phytoecia tatyanae Skrylnik, 2010

Species of beetle

Phytoecia tatyanae is a species of beetle in the family Cerambycidae. It was described by Skrylnik in 2010. It is known from Afghanistan.
