= Phytoecia orientis =

Scientific classification
- Domain: Eukaryota
- Kingdom: Animalia
- Phylum: Arthropoda
- Class: Insecta
- Order: Coleoptera
- Suborder: Polyphaga
- Infraorder: Cucujiformia
- Family: Cerambycidae
- Genus: Phytoecia
- Species: P. orientis

Binomial name
- Phytoecia orientis (Aurivillius, 1908)

Species of beetle

Phytoecia orientis is a species of beetle in the family Cerambycidae. It was described by Per Olof Christopher Aurivillius in 1908.

== Subspecies ==
- Phytoecia orientis orientis (Aurivillius, 1908)
- Phytoecia orientis medionigripennis Breuning, 1961
- Phytoecia orientis camerunica Breuning, 1977
- Phytoecia orientis togolana Téocchi & Sudre, 2003
