= Phytoecia subrufulescens =

Scientific classification
- Kingdom: Animalia
- Phylum: Arthropoda
- Class: Insecta
- Order: Coleoptera
- Suborder: Polyphaga
- Infraorder: Cucujiformia
- Family: Cerambycidae
- Genus: Phytoecia
- Species: P. subrufulescens

Binomial name
- Phytoecia subrufulescens Breuning, 1981

Species of beetle

Phytoecia subrufulescens is a species of beetle in the family Cerambycidae. It was described by Stephan von Breuning in 1981 and is known from South Africa.
