= Phytoecia pretiosa =

Scientific classification
- Domain: Eukaryota
- Kingdom: Animalia
- Phylum: Arthropoda
- Class: Insecta
- Order: Coleoptera
- Suborder: Polyphaga
- Infraorder: Cucujiformia
- Family: Cerambycidae
- Genus: Phytoecia
- Species: P. pretiosa

Binomial name
- Phytoecia pretiosa Faldermann, 1837

Synonyms
- Helladia pretiosa (Faldermann, 1837)

Species of beetle

Phytoecia pretiosa is a species of beetle in the family Cerambycidae. It was described by Faldermann in 1837. It is known from Syria, Azerbaijan, Iraq, Armenia, Iran, Turkey, and possibly Georgia. It feeds on Onopordum carduchorum.

== Subspecies ==
- Phytoecia pretiosa pretiosa Faldermann, 1837
- Phytoecia pretiosa fatima Ganglbauer, 1884
