= Phytoecia merkli =

Scientific classification
- Domain: Eukaryota
- Kingdom: Animalia
- Phylum: Arthropoda
- Class: Insecta
- Order: Coleoptera
- Suborder: Polyphaga
- Infraorder: Cucujiformia
- Family: Cerambycidae
- Genus: Phytoecia
- Species: P. merkli

Binomial name
- Phytoecia merkli Ganglbauer, 1884

Synonyms
- Phytoecia merkli merkli Ganglbauer, 1884; Helladia merkli (Ganglbauer, 1884); Neomusaria merkli (Ganglbauer, 1884)

Species of beetle

Phytoecia merkli is a species of beetle in the family Cerambycidae. It was described by Ganglbauer in 1884. It is known from Turkey, Armenia and Jordan. It contains the varietas Phytoecia merkli var. inapicalis.
