= Phytoecia sylvatica =

Scientific classification
- Kingdom: Animalia
- Phylum: Arthropoda
- Class: Insecta
- Order: Coleoptera
- Suborder: Polyphaga
- Infraorder: Cucujiformia
- Family: Cerambycidae
- Genus: Phytoecia
- Species: P. sylvatica

Binomial name
- Phytoecia sylvatica (Hintz, 1916)

Synonyms
- Obereopsis sylvatica Hintz, 1916

Species of beetle

Phytoecia sylvatica is a species of beetle in the family Cerambycidae. It was described by Hintz in 1916, originally under the genus Obereopsis. It is known from the Democratic Republic of the Congo. It contains varietas Phytoecia sylvatica var. atroapicalis.
