= Phytoecia truncatipennis =

Scientific classification
- Kingdom: Animalia
- Phylum: Arthropoda
- Class: Insecta
- Order: Coleoptera
- Suborder: Polyphaga
- Infraorder: Cucujiformia
- Family: Cerambycidae
- Genus: Phytoecia
- Species: P. truncatipennis

Binomial name
- Phytoecia truncatipennis Pic, 1919

Species of beetle

Phytoecia truncatipennis is a species of beetle in the family Cerambycidae. It was described by Maurice Pic in 1919. It is known from Iran.
