= Phytoecia acridula =

Scientific classification
- Domain: Eukaryota
- Kingdom: Animalia
- Phylum: Arthropoda
- Class: Insecta
- Order: Coleoptera
- Suborder: Polyphaga
- Infraorder: Cucujiformia
- Family: Cerambycidae
- Genus: Phytoecia
- Species: P. acridula

Binomial name
- Phytoecia acridula Holzschuh, 1981

Species of beetle

Phytoecia acridula is a species of beetle in the family Cerambycidae. It was described by Holzschuh in 1981. It is known from Tajikistan.
