= Phytoecia tekensis =

Scientific classification
- Domain: Eukaryota
- Kingdom: Animalia
- Phylum: Arthropoda
- Class: Insecta
- Order: Coleoptera
- Suborder: Polyphaga
- Infraorder: Cucujiformia
- Family: Cerambycidae
- Genus: Phytoecia
- Species: P. tekensis

Binomial name
- Phytoecia tekensis Semenov, 1896

Synonyms
- Blepisanis tekensis (Semenov) Villiers, 1967

Species of beetle

Phytoecia tekensis is a species of beetle in the family Cerambycidae. It was described by Semenov in 1896. It is known from Iran.
