= Phytoecia kabateki =

Scientific classification
- Domain: Eukaryota
- Kingdom: Animalia
- Phylum: Arthropoda
- Class: Insecta
- Order: Coleoptera
- Suborder: Polyphaga
- Infraorder: Cucujiformia
- Family: Cerambycidae
- Genus: Phytoecia
- Species: P. kabateki

Binomial name
- Phytoecia kabateki Sama, 1996

Species of beetle

Phytoecia kabateki is a species of beetle in the family Cerambycidae. It was described by Sama in 1996. It is known from Syria.
