= Phytoecia griseomaculata =

Scientific classification
- Kingdom: Animalia
- Phylum: Arthropoda
- Class: Insecta
- Order: Coleoptera
- Suborder: Polyphaga
- Infraorder: Cucujiformia
- Family: Cerambycidae
- Genus: Phytoecia
- Species: P. griseomaculata

Binomial name
- Phytoecia griseomaculata (Pic, 1891)

Synonyms
- Pilemia laterufonotata Pic, 1952; Pilemia tigrina var. griseomaculata Pic, 1891; Pilemia griseomaculata (Pic) Pic, 1906

Species of beetle

Phytoecia griseomaculata is a species of beetle in the family Cerambycidae. It was described by Maurice Pic in 1891, originally as a varietas of the species Pilemia tigrina. It is known from Turkey and Syria.
