= Phytoecia uncinata =

Scientific classification
- Kingdom: Animalia
- Phylum: Arthropoda
- Clade: Pancrustacea
- Class: Insecta
- Order: Coleoptera
- Suborder: Polyphaga
- Infraorder: Cucujiformia
- Family: Cerambycidae
- Genus: Phytoecia
- Species: P. uncinata

Binomial name
- Phytoecia uncinata (W. Redtenbacher, 1842)

Synonyms
- Opsilia uncinata (Redtenbacher) Villiers, 1978

Species of beetle

Phytoecia uncinata is a species of beetle in the family Cerambycidae. It was described by W. Redtenbacher in 1842. It has a wide distribution in Europe. It measures between 6 and 9 mm (0.24 and 0.35 in). It feeds on Cerinthe minor and Cerinthe glabra.
