= Phytoecia halperini =

Scientific classification
- Domain: Eukaryota
- Kingdom: Animalia
- Phylum: Arthropoda
- Class: Insecta
- Order: Coleoptera
- Suborder: Polyphaga
- Infraorder: Cucujiformia
- Family: Cerambycidae
- Genus: Phytoecia
- Species: P. halperini

Binomial name
- Phytoecia halperini Holzschuh, 1999

Synonyms
- Helladia halperini (Holzschuh) Sama et alii, 2010

Species of beetle

Phytoecia halperini is a species of beetle in the family Cerambycidae. It was described by Holzschuh in 1999. It is known from Israel. It feeds on Anchusa strigosa.
