= Phytoecia eugeniae =

Scientific classification
- Domain: Eukaryota
- Kingdom: Animalia
- Phylum: Arthropoda
- Class: Insecta
- Order: Coleoptera
- Suborder: Polyphaga
- Infraorder: Cucujiformia
- Family: Cerambycidae
- Genus: Phytoecia
- Species: P. eugeniae

Binomial name
- Phytoecia eugeniae Ganglbauer, 1884

Synonyms
- Pygoptosia eugeniae (Ganglbauer) Villiers, 1967; Conizonia (Pygoptosia) eugeniae (Ganglbauer) Pic, 1898; Conizonia eugeniae (Ganglbauer) Pic, 1905

Species of beetle

Phytoecia eugeniae is a species of beetle in the family Cerambycidae. It was described by Ganglbauer in 1884. It is known from Iran.

It was placed in the genus Pygoptosia Reitter, 1895 in the Catalogue of Palaearctic Coleoptera.
