= Phytoecia anatolica =

Scientific classification
- Kingdom: Animalia
- Phylum: Arthropoda
- Class: Insecta
- Order: Coleoptera
- Suborder: Polyphaga
- Infraorder: Cucujiformia
- Family: Cerambycidae
- Genus: Phytoecia
- Species: P. anatolica

Binomial name
- Phytoecia anatolica E. Fuchs & Breuning, 1971

Species of beetle

Phytoecia anatolica is a species of beetle in the family Cerambycidae. It was described by Ernst Fuchs and Stephan von Breuning in 1971. It is known from Turkey.
