= Phytoecia paulusi =

Scientific classification
- Domain: Eukaryota
- Kingdom: Animalia
- Phylum: Arthropoda
- Class: Insecta
- Order: Coleoptera
- Suborder: Polyphaga
- Infraorder: Cucujiformia
- Family: Cerambycidae
- Genus: Phytoecia
- Species: P. paulusi

Binomial name
- Phytoecia paulusi Holzschuh, 1971

Synonyms
- Helladia paulusi (Holzschuh, 1971)

Species of beetle

Phytoecia paulusi is a species of beetle in the family Cerambycidae. It was described by Holzschuh in 1971. It lives for one year and 11 - 14 mm (0.43-0.55 inch) long.

== Subspecies ==
- Phytoecia paulusi paulusi Holzschuh, 1971
- Phytoecia paulusi bludanica (Sama, 2000)
