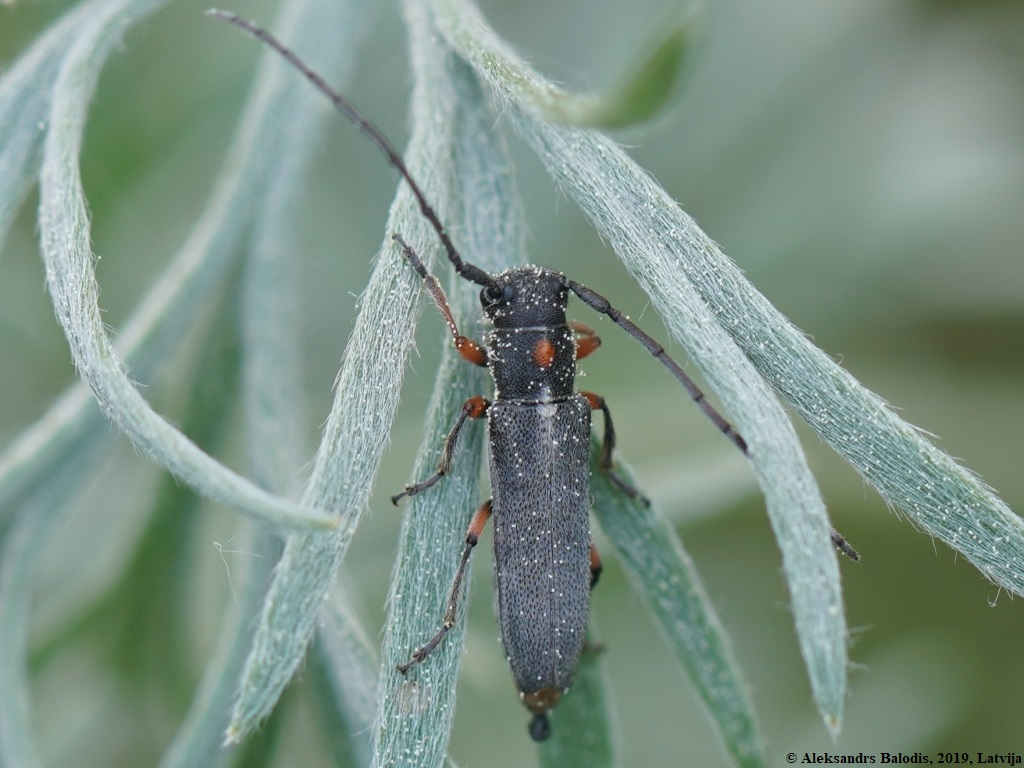

Scientific classification
- Domain: Eukaryota
- Kingdom: Animalia
- Phylum: Arthropoda
- Class: Insecta
- Order: Coleoptera
- Suborder: Polyphaga
- Infraorder: Cucujiformia
- Family: Cerambycidae
- Genus: Phytoecia
- Species: P. pustulata

Binomial name
- Phytoecia pustulata (Schrank, 1776)

Synonyms
- Phytoecia lineola Küster, 1846; Cerambyx pustulatus Schrank, 1776

= Phytoecia pustulata =

Species of beetle

Phytoecia pustulata is a species of beetle in the family Cerambycidae. It was described by Schrank in 1776, originally under the genus Cerambyx. It has a wide distribution throughout Europe and the Middle East.

== Subspecies ==
- Phytoecia pustulata pulla Ganglbauer, 1886
- Phytoecia pustulata pilipennis Reitter, 1895
- Phytoecia pustulata adulta Ganglbauer, 1884
- Phytoecia pustulata pustulata (Schrank, 1776)
