= Phytoecia hovorkai =

Scientific classification
- Domain: Eukaryota
- Kingdom: Animalia
- Phylum: Arthropoda
- Class: Insecta
- Order: Coleoptera
- Suborder: Polyphaga
- Infraorder: Cucujiformia
- Family: Cerambycidae
- Genus: Phytoecia
- Species: P. hovorkai

Binomial name
- Phytoecia hovorkai Teocchi & Sudre, 2009

Species of beetle

Phytoecia hovorkai is a species of beetle in the family Cerambycidae. It was described by Pierre Téocchi and Jérôme Sudre in 2009. It is known from Kenya.
