= Phytoecia vittata =

Scientific classification
- Kingdom: Animalia
- Phylum: Arthropoda
- Class: Insecta
- Order: Coleoptera
- Suborder: Polyphaga
- Infraorder: Cucujiformia
- Family: Cerambycidae
- Genus: Phytoecia
- Species: P. vittata

Binomial name
- Phytoecia vittata (Péringuey, 1888)

Synonyms
- Nitocris vittata Péringuey, 1888

Species of beetle

Phytoecia vittata is a species of beetle in the family Cerambycidae. It was described by Péringuey in 1888.
