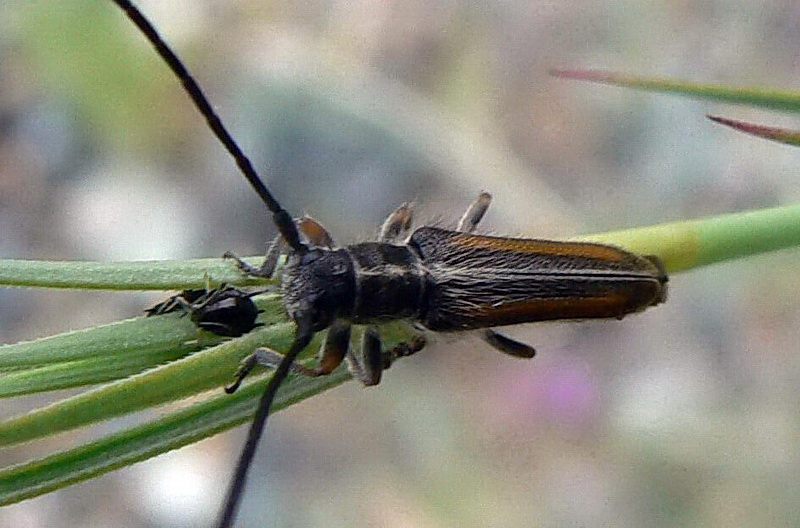
- Blepisanis vittipennis near Miratovac village, S Serbia

Scientific classification
- Kingdom: Animalia
- Phylum: Arthropoda
- Class: Insecta
- Order: Coleoptera
- Suborder: Polyphaga
- Infraorder: Cucujiformia
- Family: Cerambycidae
- Genus: Phytoecia
- Species: P. vittipennis

Binomial name
- Phytoecia vittipennis Reiche, 1877

Synonyms
- Obereina vittipennis (Reiche) Demelt, 1982; Blepisanis vittipennis (Reiche) Tozlu, Rejzek & Özbek, 2003

= Phytoecia vittipennis =

Species of beetle

Phytoecia vittipennis is a species of beetle in the family Cerambycidae. It was described by Reiche in 1877. It is known from Armenia, Syria, Bulgaria, Greece, and Turkey. It feeds on Achillea arabica.

== Subspecies ==
- Phytoecia vittipennis prawei Plavilstshikov, 1926
- Phytoecia vittipennis leuthneri Ganglbauer, 1886
- Phytoecia vittipennis vittipennis Reiche, 1877
