= Phytoecia transcaspica =

Scientific classification
- Domain: Eukaryota
- Kingdom: Animalia
- Phylum: Arthropoda
- Class: Insecta
- Order: Coleoptera
- Suborder: Polyphaga
- Infraorder: Cucujiformia
- Family: Cerambycidae
- Genus: Phytoecia
- Species: P. transcaspica

Binomial name
- Phytoecia transcaspica E. Fuchs, 1955

Synonyms
- Opsilia transcaspica (E. Fuchs, 1955)

Species of beetle

Phytoecia transcaspica is a species of beetle in the family Cerambycidae. It was described by Ernst Fuchs in 1955.
