= Phytoecia schuberti =

Scientific classification
- Domain: Eukaryota
- Kingdom: Animalia
- Phylum: Arthropoda
- Class: Insecta
- Order: Coleoptera
- Suborder: Polyphaga
- Infraorder: Cucujiformia
- Family: Cerambycidae
- Genus: Phytoecia
- Species: P. schuberti

Binomial name
- Phytoecia schuberti E. Fuchs, 1965

Synonyms
- Conizonia schuberti (E. Fuchs, 1966); Coptosia schuberti (E. Fuchs, 1965)

Species of beetle

Phytoecia schuberti is a species of beetle in the family Cerambycidae. It was first described by Ernst Fuchs in 1965. It is known from Turkey.
