= Phytoecia gaubilii =

Scientific classification
- Domain: Eukaryota
- Kingdom: Animalia
- Phylum: Arthropoda
- Class: Insecta
- Order: Coleoptera
- Suborder: Polyphaga
- Infraorder: Cucujiformia
- Family: Cerambycidae
- Genus: Phytoecia
- Species: P. gaubilii

Binomial name
- Phytoecia gaubilii Mulsant, 1851

Synonyms
- Phytoecia gaubili (Mulsant) Villiers, 1946

Species of beetle

Phytoecia gaubilii is a species of beetle in the family Cerambycidae. It was described by Mulsant in 1851. It is known from Tunisia and Algeria.

== Varietas ==
- Phytoecia gaubilii var. innotata Pic, 1898
- Phytoecia gaubilii var. separata Pic, 1895
- Phytoecia gaubilii var. griseipes Pic, 1890
- Phytoecia gaubilii var. impunctata Pic, 1895
- Phytoecia gaubilii var. gabilloti Pic, 1891
- Phytoecia gaubilii var. peregrina Reiche, 1877
