= Phytoecia angusterufonotata =

Scientific classification
- Kingdom: Animalia
- Phylum: Arthropoda
- Class: Insecta
- Order: Coleoptera
- Suborder: Polyphaga
- Infraorder: Cucujiformia
- Family: Cerambycidae
- Genus: Phytoecia
- Species: P. angusterufonotata

Binomial name
- Phytoecia angusterufonotata (Pic, 1952)

Synonyms
- Phytoecia inarmata Holzschuh, 1984; Phytoecia tigrina (Mulsant) Demelt, 1967; Pilemia tigrina var. angusterufonotata Pic, 1952; Pilemia inarmata (Holzschuh, 1984)

Species of beetle

Phytoecia angusterufonotata is a species of beetle in the family Cerambycidae. It was described by Maurice Pic in 1952. It is known from Greece. It feeds on Anchusa hybrida.
