= Phytoecia luteovittigera =

Scientific classification
- Kingdom: Animalia
- Phylum: Arthropoda
- Class: Insecta
- Order: Coleoptera
- Suborder: Polyphaga
- Infraorder: Cucujiformia
- Family: Cerambycidae
- Genus: Phytoecia
- Species: P. luteovittigera

Binomial name
- Phytoecia luteovittigera Pic, 1906

Synonyms
- Pseudoblepisanis luteovittigera Villiers, 1964

Species of beetle

Phytoecia luteovittigera is a species of beetle in the family Cerambycidae. It was described by Maurice Pic in 1906. It is known from Iran.
