= Phytoecia katarinae =

Scientific classification
- Domain: Eukaryota
- Kingdom: Animalia
- Phylum: Arthropoda
- Class: Insecta
- Order: Coleoptera
- Suborder: Polyphaga
- Infraorder: Cucujiformia
- Family: Cerambycidae
- Genus: Phytoecia
- Species: P. katarinae

Binomial name
- Phytoecia katarinae Holzschuh, 1974

Synonyms
- Semiangusta katarinae (Holzschuh) Sama, Rapuzzi & Ozdikmen, 2012

Species of beetle

Phytoecia katarinae is a species of beetle in the family Cerambycidae. It was described by Holzschuh in 1974. It is known from Turkey.
