= Phytoecia kurdistana =

Scientific classification
- Domain: Eukaryota
- Kingdom: Animalia
- Phylum: Arthropoda
- Class: Insecta
- Order: Coleoptera
- Suborder: Polyphaga
- Infraorder: Cucujiformia
- Family: Cerambycidae
- Genus: Phytoecia
- Species: P. kurdistana

Binomial name
- Phytoecia kurdistana Ganglbauer, 1883

Synonyms
- Musaria kurdistana (Ganglbauer) Pic, 1897

Species of beetle

Phytoecia kurdistana is a species of beetle in the family Cerambycidae. It was described by Ganglbauer in 1883. It is known from Turkey, Armenia and Iran.

== Varietas ==
- Phytoecia kurdistana var. korbi Pic, 1918
- Phytoecia kurdistana var. caucasica Pic, 1897
- Phytoecia kurdistana var. luristanica Pic, 1917
