= Phytoecia testaceolimbata =

Scientific classification
- Kingdom: Animalia
- Phylum: Arthropoda
- Class: Insecta
- Order: Coleoptera
- Suborder: Polyphaga
- Infraorder: Cucujiformia
- Family: Cerambycidae
- Genus: Phytoecia
- Species: P. testaceolimbata

Binomial name
- Phytoecia testaceolimbata Pic, 1933

Species of beetle

Phytoecia testaceolimbata is a species of beetle in the family Cerambycidae. It was described by Maurice Pic in 1933. It is known from China.
