= Phytoecia repetkensis =

Scientific classification
- Domain: Eukaryota
- Kingdom: Animalia
- Phylum: Arthropoda
- Class: Insecta
- Order: Coleoptera
- Suborder: Polyphaga
- Infraorder: Cucujiformia
- Family: Cerambycidae
- Genus: Phytoecia
- Species: P. repetkensis

Binomial name
- Phytoecia repetkensis Semenov, 1935

Species of beetle

Phytoecia repetkensis is a species of beetle in the family Cerambycidae. It was described by Semenov in 1935. It is known from Kazakhstan and Turkmenistan.
