= Phytoecia rufipes =

Scientific classification
- Kingdom: Animalia
- Phylum: Arthropoda
- Clade: Pancrustacea
- Class: Insecta
- Order: Coleoptera
- Suborder: Polyphaga
- Infraorder: Cucujiformia
- Family: Cerambycidae
- Genus: Phytoecia
- Species: P. rufipes

Binomial name
- Phytoecia rufipes (Olivier, 1795)

Synonyms
- Phytoecia ludovici Pic, 1891; Saperda rufipes Olivier, 1795

Species of beetle

Phytoecia rufipes is a species of beetle in the family Cerambycidae. It was described by Guillaume-Antoine Olivier in 1795. It has a wide distribution in Europe and the Middle East. It feeds on Foeniculum vulgare.

== Subspecies ==
- Phytoecia rufipes latior Pic, 1895
- Phytoecia rufipes bangi Pic, 1901
- Phytoecia rufipes rufipes (Olivier, 1795)
