= Phytoecia schurmanni =

Scientific classification
- Domain: Eukaryota
- Kingdom: Animalia
- Phylum: Arthropoda
- Class: Insecta
- Order: Coleoptera
- Suborder: Polyphaga
- Infraorder: Cucujiformia
- Family: Cerambycidae
- Genus: Phytoecia
- Species: P. schurmanni

Binomial name
- Phytoecia schurmanni E. Fuchs, 1971

Synonyms
- Opsilia schurmanni (E. Fuchs, 1971)

Species of beetle

Phytoecia schurmanni is a species of beetle in the family Cerambycidae. It was described by Ernst Fuchs in 1971. It is known from Macedonia.
