= Phytoecia waltli =

Scientific classification
- Domain: Eukaryota
- Kingdom: Animalia
- Phylum: Arthropoda
- Class: Insecta
- Order: Coleoptera
- Suborder: Polyphaga
- Infraorder: Cucujiformia
- Family: Cerambycidae
- Genus: Phytoecia
- Species: P. waltli

Binomial name
- Phytoecia waltli (Sama, 1991)

Synonyms
- Phytoecia (Musaria) modesta (Waltl) Pic, 1905; Phytoecia modesta (Waltl) Ganglbauer, 1884; Saperda (Phytoecia) modesta (Waltl) Waltl, 1868; Saperda modesta Waltl, 1838 nec Fabricius, 1781; Musaria modesta (Waltl) Sama, 1982; Neomusara modesta (Waltl); Neomusaria waltli Sama, 1991; Helladia modesta (Waltl) Pic, 1903

Species of beetle

Phytoecia waltli is a species of beetle in the family Cerambycidae. It was described by Sama in 1991, originally under the genus Neomusaria. It is known from Syria, Lebanon, Jordan, Israel, and Turkey.
