= Phytoecia armeniaca =

Scientific classification
- Domain: Eukaryota
- Kingdom: Animalia
- Phylum: Arthropoda
- Class: Insecta
- Order: Coleoptera
- Suborder: Polyphaga
- Infraorder: Cucujiformia
- Family: Cerambycidae
- Genus: Phytoecia
- Species: P. armeniaca

Binomial name
- Phytoecia armeniaca Frivaldsky, 1878

Synonyms
- Helladia armeniaca (Frivaldsky, 1878)

Species of beetle

Phytoecia armeniaca is a species of beetle in the family Cerambycidae. It was described by Frivaldsky in 1878. It is known from Turkey, Syria, Azerbaijan, Armenia, and Iran.

== Subspecies ==
- Phytoecia armeniaca natali (Lobanov, 1994)
- Phytoecia armeniaca armeniaca Frivaldsky, 1878
