= Phytoecia mongolorum =

Scientific classification
- Domain: Eukaryota
- Kingdom: Animalia
- Phylum: Arthropoda
- Class: Insecta
- Order: Coleoptera
- Suborder: Polyphaga
- Infraorder: Cucujiformia
- Family: Cerambycidae
- Genus: Phytoecia
- Species: P. mongolorum

Binomial name
- Phytoecia mongolorum Namhaidorzh, 1979

Species of beetle

Phytoecia mongolorum is a species of beetle in the family Cerambycidae. It was described by Namhaidorzh in 1979. It is known from Mongolia.
