= Phytoecia neavei =

Scientific classification
- Kingdom: Animalia
- Phylum: Arthropoda
- Class: Insecta
- Order: Coleoptera
- Suborder: Polyphaga
- Infraorder: Cucujiformia
- Family: Cerambycidae
- Genus: Phytoecia
- Species: P. neavei

Binomial name
- Phytoecia neavei Aurivillius, 1914

Synonyms
- Phytoecia neavei m. kivuensis Breuning, 1973; Phytoecia neavei m. atrampliata Téocchi & Sudre, 2003

Species of beetle

Phytoecia neavei is a species of beetle in the family Cerambycidae. It was described by Per Olof Christopher Aurivillius in 1914. It is known from the Democratic Republic of the Congo.
