= Phytoecia varentzovi =

Scientific classification
- Domain: Eukaryota
- Kingdom: Animalia
- Phylum: Arthropoda
- Class: Insecta
- Order: Coleoptera
- Suborder: Polyphaga
- Infraorder: Cucujiformia
- Family: Cerambycidae
- Genus: Phytoecia
- Species: P. varentzovi

Binomial name
- Phytoecia varentzovi Semenov, 1896

Synonyms
- Opsilia varentzovi (Semenov, 1896)

Species of beetle

Phytoecia varentzovi is a species of beetle in the family Cerambycidae. It was described by Semenov in 1896.
