= Phytoecia bucharica =

Scientific classification
- Kingdom: Animalia
- Phylum: Arthropoda
- Class: Insecta
- Order: Coleoptera
- Suborder: Polyphaga
- Infraorder: Cucujiformia
- Family: Cerambycidae
- Genus: Phytoecia
- Species: P. bucharica

Binomial name
- Phytoecia bucharica Breuning, 1943

Synonyms
- Phytoecia breuningi Dahlgren, 1988; Opsilia bucharica (Breuning, 1943)

Species of beetle

Phytoecia bucharica is a species of beetle in the family Cerambycidae. It was described by Breuning in 1943. It is known from Tajikistan.
