= Phytoecia imperialis =

Scientific classification
- Domain: Eukaryota
- Kingdom: Animalia
- Phylum: Arthropoda
- Class: Insecta
- Order: Coleoptera
- Suborder: Polyphaga
- Infraorder: Cucujiformia
- Family: Cerambycidae
- Genus: Phytoecia
- Species: P. imperialis

Binomial name
- Phytoecia imperialis (Sama & Rejzek, 2001)

Synonyms
- Helladia imperialis Sama & Rejzek, 2001

Species of beetle

Phytoecia imperialis is a species of beetle in the family Cerambycidae. It was described by Sama and Rejzek in 2001. It is known from Iran.
