= Phytoecia aterrima =

Scientific classification
- Kingdom: Animalia
- Phylum: Arthropoda
- Class: Insecta
- Order: Coleoptera
- Suborder: Polyphaga
- Infraorder: Cucujiformia
- Family: Cerambycidae
- Genus: Phytoecia
- Species: P. aterrima

Binomial name
- Phytoecia aterrima Breuning, 1951

Synonyms
- Blepisanis nigerrima Breuning, 1950 nec

Species of beetle

Phytoecia aterrima is a species of beetle in the family Cerambycidae. It was described by Stephan von Breuning in 1951. It is known from the Democratic Republic of the Congo and Zambia. It contains the varietas Phytoecia aterrima var. gilbertae.
