= Phytoecia behen =

Scientific classification
- Kingdom: Animalia
- Phylum: Arthropoda
- Clade: Pancrustacea
- Class: Insecta
- Order: Coleoptera
- Suborder: Polyphaga
- Infraorder: Cucujiformia
- Family: Cerambycidae
- Genus: Phytoecia
- Species: P. behen

Binomial name
- Phytoecia behen Sama & Rejzek, 1999

Synonyms
- Coptosia behen (Sama & Rejzek, 1999)

Species of beetle

Phytoecia behen is a species of beetle in the family Cerambycidae. It is known from northeast Turkey. It feeds on Centaurea urvillei.

Phytoecia behen measure 10–14 mm (0.39–0.55 in).
