= Phytoecia delagrangei =

Scientific classification
- Kingdom: Animalia
- Phylum: Arthropoda
- Class: Insecta
- Order: Coleoptera
- Suborder: Polyphaga
- Infraorder: Cucujiformia
- Family: Cerambycidae
- Genus: Phytoecia
- Species: P. delagrangei

Binomial name
- Phytoecia delagrangei Pic, 1892

Synonyms
- Semiangusta delagrangei (Pic) Plavilstshikov, 1948; Conizonia (Semiangusta) delagrangei (Pic) Aurivillius, 1922

Species of beetle

Phytoecia delagrangei is a species of beetle in the family Cerambycidae. It was described by Maurice Pic in 1892. It is known from Turkey.
