= Phytoecia maculicollis =

Scientific classification
- Kingdom: Animalia
- Phylum: Arthropoda
- Class: Insecta
- Order: Coleoptera
- Suborder: Polyphaga
- Infraorder: Cucujiformia
- Family: Cerambycidae
- Genus: Phytoecia
- Species: P. maculicollis

Binomial name
- Phytoecia maculicollis (Péringuey, 1888)

Synonyms
- Nitocris maculicollis Peringuey, 1888

Species of beetle

Phytoecia maculicollis is a species of beetle in the family Cerambycidae. It was described by Péringuey in 1888, originally under the genus Nitocris.
