= Phytoecia flavipes =

Scientific classification
- Domain: Eukaryota
- Kingdom: Animalia
- Phylum: Arthropoda
- Class: Insecta
- Order: Coleoptera
- Suborder: Polyphaga
- Infraorder: Cucujiformia
- Family: Cerambycidae
- Genus: Phytoecia
- Species: P. flavipes

Binomial name
- Phytoecia flavipes (Fabricius, 1801)

Synonyms
- Saperda flavipes Fabricius, 1801

Species of beetle

Phytoecia flavipes is a species of beetle in the family Cerambycidae. It was described by Johan Christian Fabricius in 1801. It is known from Morocco.
