= Phytoecia rebeccae =

Scientific classification
- Domain: Eukaryota
- Kingdom: Animalia
- Phylum: Arthropoda
- Class: Insecta
- Order: Coleoptera
- Suborder: Polyphaga
- Infraorder: Cucujiformia
- Family: Cerambycidae
- Genus: Phytoecia
- Species: P. rebeccae

Binomial name
- Phytoecia rebeccae (Sama & Rejzek, 2002)

Synonyms
- Semiangusta rebeccae Sama & Rejzek, 2002; Phytoecia rebbeccae Auctt. (MIssp.)

Species of beetle

Phytoecia rebeccae is a species of beetle in the family Cerambycidae. It was described by Sama and Rejzek in 2002.
