= Phytoecia annulata =

Scientific classification
- Domain: Eukaryota
- Kingdom: Animalia
- Phylum: Arthropoda
- Class: Insecta
- Order: Coleoptera
- Suborder: Polyphaga
- Infraorder: Cucujiformia
- Family: Cerambycidae
- Genus: Phytoecia
- Species: P. annulata

Binomial name
- Phytoecia annulata Hampe, 1852

Synonyms
- Pilemia annulata (Hampe) Reitter, 1905

Species of beetle

Phytoecia annulata is a species of beetle in the family Cerambycidae. It was described by Hampe in 1852. It is known from Syria, Iran, and Turkey.

== Varietas ==
- Phytoecia annulata var. wawerkana (Reitter, 1905)
- Phytoecia annulata var. angorensis (Pic, 1952)
