= Phytoecia tirellii =

Scientific classification
- Domain: Eukaryota
- Kingdom: Animalia
- Phylum: Arthropoda
- Class: Insecta
- Order: Coleoptera
- Suborder: Polyphaga
- Infraorder: Cucujiformia
- Family: Cerambycidae
- Genus: Phytoecia
- Species: P. tirellii

Binomial name
- Phytoecia tirellii Luigioni, 1913

Synonyms
- Musaria tirellii (Luigioni, 1913)

Species of beetle

Phytoecia tirellii is a species of beetle in the family Cerambycidae. It was described by Luigioni in 1913. It is known from Italy. It feeds on Crepis lacera.
