= Phytoecia fervida =

Scientific classification
- Domain: Eukaryota
- Kingdom: Animalia
- Phylum: Arthropoda
- Class: Insecta
- Order: Coleoptera
- Suborder: Polyphaga
- Infraorder: Cucujiformia
- Family: Cerambycidae
- Genus: Phytoecia
- Species: P. fervida

Binomial name
- Phytoecia fervida (Pascoe, 1871)

Synonyms
- Phytoecia fervida m. subternigrescens Breuning, 1978; Blepisanis fervida Pascoe, 1871

Species of beetle

Phytoecia fervida is a species of beetle in the family Cerambycidae. It was described by Francis Polkinghorne Pascoe in 1871. It is known from South Africa.
