= Phytoecia orbicollis =

Scientific classification
- Domain: Eukaryota
- Kingdom: Animalia
- Phylum: Arthropoda
- Class: Insecta
- Order: Coleoptera
- Suborder: Polyphaga
- Infraorder: Cucujiformia
- Family: Cerambycidae
- Genus: Phytoecia
- Species: P. orbicollis

Binomial name
- Phytoecia orbicollis Reiche & Saulcy, 1858

Synonyms
- Helladia orbicollis (Reiche & Saulcy) Sama, 1982

Species of beetle

Phytoecia orbicollis is a species of beetle in the family Cerambycidae. It was described by Reiche and Saulcy in 1858. It is known from Syria, Cyprus, Armenia, Lebanon, and Turkey.

== Subspecies ==
- Phytoecia orbicollis orbicollis Reiche & Saulcy, 1858
- Phytoecia orbicollis adelpha Ganglbauer, 1886
