= Phytoecia analis =

Scientific classification
- Kingdom: Animalia
- Phylum: Arthropoda
- Clade: Pancrustacea
- Class: Insecta
- Order: Coleoptera
- Suborder: Polyphaga
- Infraorder: Cucujiformia
- Family: Cerambycidae
- Genus: Phytoecia
- Species: P. analis

Binomial name
- Phytoecia analis (Fabricius, 1781)

Synonyms
- Saperda analis Fabricius, 1781

Species of beetle

Phytoecia analis is a species of beetle in the family Cerambycidae. It was described by Johan Christian Fabricius in 1781, originally under the genus Saperda. It has a wide distribution in Africa.

== Varietas ==
- Phytoecia analis var. rufiniabdominalis Breuning, 1951
- Phytoecia analis var. guineensis (Kolbe, 1893)
