= Phytoecia salvicola =

Scientific classification
- Domain: Eukaryota
- Kingdom: Animalia
- Phylum: Arthropoda
- Class: Insecta
- Order: Coleoptera
- Suborder: Polyphaga
- Infraorder: Cucujiformia
- Family: Cerambycidae
- Genus: Phytoecia
- Species: P. salvicola

Binomial name
- Phytoecia salvicola Holzschuh, 1989

Synonyms
- Neomusaria salvicola (Holzschuh)

Species of beetle

Phytoecia salvicola is a species of beetle in the family Cerambycidae. It was described by Holzschuh in 1989. It is known from Turkey.
