= Phytoecia prasina =

Scientific classification
- Kingdom: Animalia
- Phylum: Arthropoda
- Class: Insecta
- Order: Coleoptera
- Suborder: Polyphaga
- Infraorder: Cucujiformia
- Family: Cerambycidae
- Genus: Phytoecia
- Species: P. prasina

Binomial name
- Phytoecia prasina Reitter, 1911

Synonyms
- Opsilia prasina (Reitter, 1911)

Species of beetle

Phytoecia prasina is a species of beetle in the family Cerambycidae. It was described by Edmund Reitter in 1911.
