= Phytoecia nigriventris =

Scientific classification
- Domain: Eukaryota
- Kingdom: Animalia
- Phylum: Arthropoda
- Class: Insecta
- Order: Coleoptera
- Suborder: Polyphaga
- Infraorder: Cucujiformia
- Family: Cerambycidae
- Genus: Phytoecia
- Species: P. nigriventris

Binomial name
- Phytoecia nigriventris (Kolbe, 1893)

Synonyms
- Phytoecia nigriventris m. aureorubra Téocchi & Sudre, 2003; Blepisanis nigriventris Kolbe, 1893

Species of beetle

Phytoecia nigriventris is a species of beetle in the family Cerambycidae. It was described by Hermann Julius Kolbe in 1893, originally under the genus Blepisanis. It has a wide distribution in Africa.

== Subspecies ==
- Phytoecia nigriventris nigriventris (Kolbe, 1893)
- Phytoecia nigriventris dimidiata (Aurivillius, 1914)
