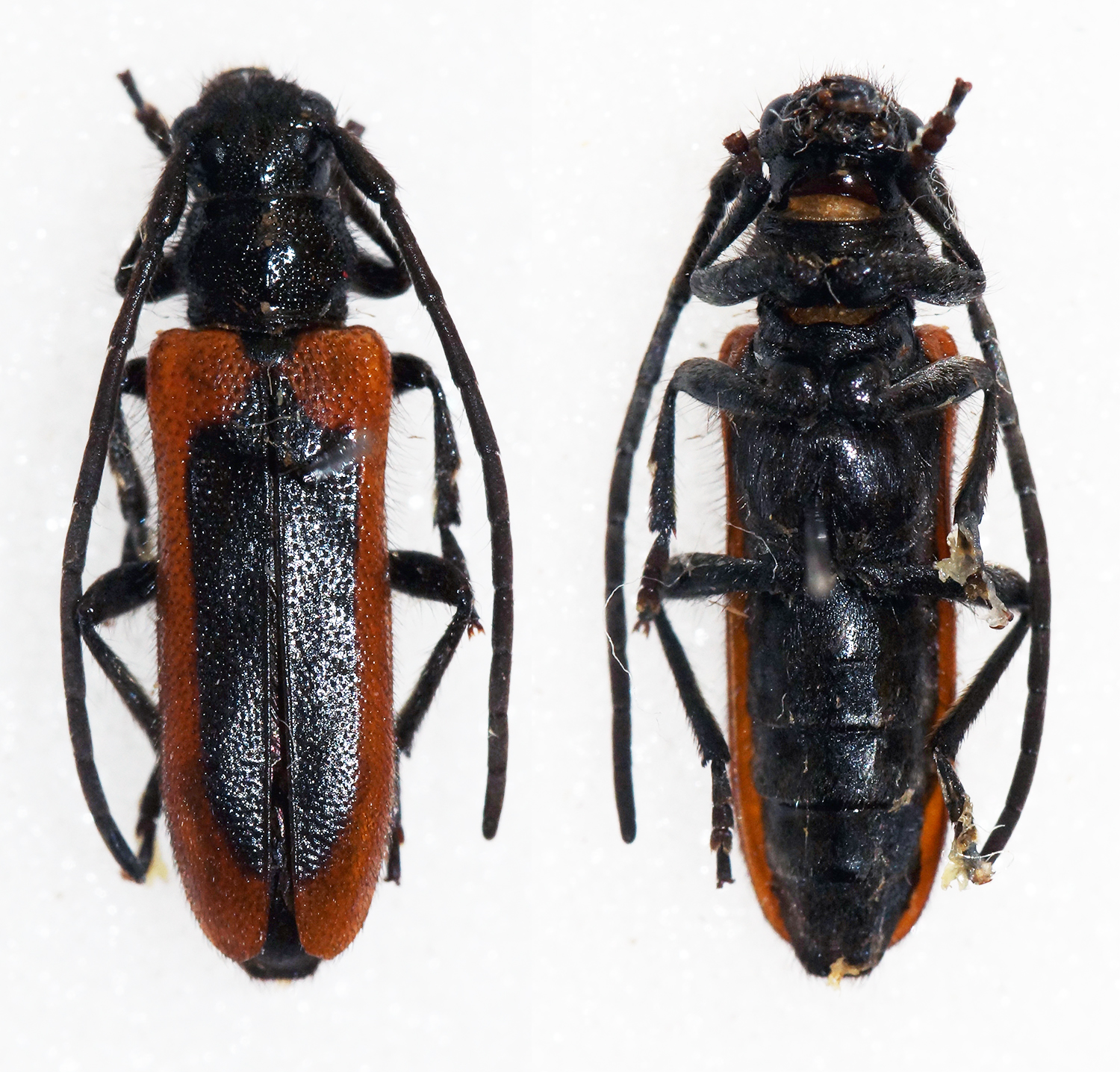

Scientific classification
- Domain: Eukaryota
- Kingdom: Animalia
- Phylum: Arthropoda
- Class: Insecta
- Order: Coleoptera
- Suborder: Polyphaga
- Infraorder: Cucujiformia
- Family: Cerambycidae
- Genus: Phytoecia
- Species: P. circumdata

Binomial name
- Phytoecia circumdata Kraatz, 1882

Synonyms
- Helladia circumdata circumdata (Kraatz); Helladia (Fulgophytoecia) circumdata (Kraatz) Pic, 1903; Pseudomallosia parterufipennis Breuning, 1967; Phytoecia sellata Ganglbauer, 1887; Phytoecia (Blepisanis) circumdata (Kraatz) Breuning, 1951; Phytoecia (Fulgophytoecia) circumdata circumdata (Kraatz) Holzschuh, 1981

= Phytoecia circumdata =

Species of beetle

Phytoecia circumdata is a species of beetle in the family Cerambycidae. It was described by Kraatz in 1882. It is known from Kazakhstan, Uzbekistan, and Iran.
