= Phytoecia brunnerae =

Scientific classification
- Kingdom: Animalia
- Phylum: Arthropoda
- Clade: Pancrustacea
- Class: Insecta
- Order: Coleoptera
- Suborder: Polyphaga
- Infraorder: Cucujiformia
- Family: Cerambycidae
- Genus: Phytoecia
- Species: P. brunnerae

Binomial name
- Phytoecia brunnerae (Sama, 2000)

Synonyms
- Coptosia brunnerae Sama, 2000

Species of beetle

Phytoecia brunnerae is a species of beetle in the family Cerambycidae. It is known from Syria and Jordan.
