= Phytoecia guilleti =

Scientific classification
- Kingdom: Animalia
- Phylum: Arthropoda
- Class: Insecta
- Order: Coleoptera
- Suborder: Polyphaga
- Infraorder: Cucujiformia
- Family: Cerambycidae
- Genus: Phytoecia
- Species: P. guilleti

Binomial name
- Phytoecia guilleti Pic, 1906

Species of beetle

Phytoecia guilleti is a species of beetle in the family Cerambycidae. It was described by Maurice Pic in 1906.

== Subspecies ==
- Phytoecia guilleti guilleti Pic, 1906
- Phytoecia guilleti callosicollis Pic, 1933
