= Phytoecia molybdaena =

Scientific classification
- Domain: Eukaryota
- Kingdom: Animalia
- Phylum: Arthropoda
- Class: Insecta
- Order: Coleoptera
- Suborder: Polyphaga
- Infraorder: Cucujiformia
- Family: Cerambycidae
- Genus: Phytoecia
- Species: P. molybdaena

Binomial name
- Phytoecia molybdaena (Dalman, 1817)

Synonyms
- Opsilia molybdaena (Dalman, 1817) Villiers, 1978; Opsilia longitarsis (Reitter) Vives, 2001; Phytoecia longitarsis Reitter, 1911

Species of beetle

Phytoecia molybdaena is a species of beetle in the family Cerambycidae. It was described by Dalman in 1817. It has a wide distribution in Europe; its population in the Czech Republic is purportedly extinct. It measures between 5 and 7 mm (0.20 and 0.28 in).
