= Phytoecia subannularis =

Scientific classification
- Kingdom: Animalia
- Phylum: Arthropoda
- Class: Insecta
- Order: Coleoptera
- Suborder: Polyphaga
- Infraorder: Cucujiformia
- Family: Cerambycidae
- Genus: Phytoecia
- Species: P. subannularis

Binomial name
- Phytoecia subannularis Pic, 1901

Synonyms
- Phytoecia subannulipes (Pic) Pic, 1910; Phytoecia subannularis subannularis Pic, 1901

Species of beetle

Phytoecia subannularis is a species of beetle in the family Cerambycidae. It was described by Maurice Pic in 1901. It is known from Turkey and Syria.
