= Phytoecia basirufipennis =

Scientific classification
- Kingdom: Animalia
- Phylum: Arthropoda
- Class: Insecta
- Order: Coleoptera
- Suborder: Polyphaga
- Infraorder: Cucujiformia
- Family: Cerambycidae
- Genus: Phytoecia
- Subgenus: Blepisanis
- Species: P. basirufipennis

Binomial name
- Phytoecia basirufipennis (Breuning, 1954)

Synonyms
- Blepisanis basirufipennis Breunig, 1954

Species of beetle

Phytoecia basirufipennis is a species of beetle in the family Cerambycidae. The scientific name of this species was first published in 1954 by Breuning, as Blepisanis basirufipennis. It was later transferred to Phytoecia when Blepisanis was reclassified as a subgenus.
