= Phytoecia nausicae =

Scientific classification
- Kingdom: Animalia
- Phylum: Arthropoda
- Clade: Pancrustacea
- Class: Insecta
- Order: Coleoptera
- Suborder: Polyphaga
- Infraorder: Cucujiformia
- Family: Cerambycidae
- Genus: Phytoecia
- Species: P. nausicae

Binomial name
- Phytoecia nausicae Rejzek & Kakiopoulos, 2004

Species of beetle

Phytoecia nausicae is a species of beetle in the family Cerambycidae. It is known from northwestern Greece. It feeds on Centaurea thracica.

Phytoecia nausicae measure 10.8–13.3 mm (0.43–0.52 in).
