= Phytoecia astarte =

Scientific classification
- Domain: Eukaryota
- Kingdom: Animalia
- Phylum: Arthropoda
- Class: Insecta
- Order: Coleoptera
- Suborder: Polyphaga
- Infraorder: Cucujiformia
- Family: Cerambycidae
- Genus: Phytoecia
- Species: P. astarte

Binomial name
- Phytoecia astarte Ganglbauer, 1885

Synonyms
- Musaria astarte (Ganglbauer, 1885)

Species of beetle

Phytoecia astarte is a species of beetle in the family Cerambycidae. It was described by Ganglbauer in 1885. It is known from Syria, Lebanon, Azerbaijan, Georgia, Armenia, and Turkey.

== Subspecies ==
- Phytoecia astarte lederi Pic, 1899
- Phytoecia astarte perrini Pic, 1891
- Phytoecia astarte astarte Ganglbauer, 1885
