= Phytoecia diademata =

Scientific classification
- Domain: Eukaryota
- Kingdom: Animalia
- Phylum: Arthropoda
- Class: Insecta
- Order: Coleoptera
- Suborder: Polyphaga
- Infraorder: Cucujiformia
- Family: Cerambycidae
- Genus: Phytoecia
- Species: P. diademata

Binomial name
- Phytoecia diademata Faldermann, 1837

Synonyms
- Helladia diademata (Faldermann, 1837)

Species of beetle

Phytoecia diademata is a species of beetle in the family Cerambycidae. It was described by Faldermann in 1837. It is known from Iran, Turkey and the Caucasus Mountains.
