= Phytoecia testaceovittata =

Scientific classification
- Kingdom: Animalia
- Phylum: Arthropoda
- Class: Insecta
- Order: Coleoptera
- Suborder: Polyphaga
- Infraorder: Cucujiformia
- Family: Cerambycidae
- Genus: Phytoecia
- Species: P. testaceovittata

Binomial name
- Phytoecia testaceovittata (Pic, 1934)

Synonyms
- Musaria testaceovittata Pic, 1934; Helladia iranica Villiers, 1960

Species of beetle

Phytoecia testaceovittata is a species of beetle in the family Cerambycidae. It was described by Maurice Pic in 1934. It is known from Iran.
