= Phytoecia smatanai =

Scientific classification
- Domain: Eukaryota
- Kingdom: Animalia
- Phylum: Arthropoda
- Class: Insecta
- Order: Coleoptera
- Suborder: Polyphaga
- Infraorder: Cucujiformia
- Family: Cerambycidae
- Genus: Phytoecia
- Species: P. smatanai

Binomial name
- Phytoecia smatanai Holzschuh, 2003

Species of beetle

Phytoecia smatanai is a species of beetle in the family Cerambycidae. It was described by Holzschuh in 2003. It is known from Turkey.
