= Phytoecia collaris =

Scientific classification
- Domain: Eukaryota
- Kingdom: Animalia
- Phylum: Arthropoda
- Class: Insecta
- Order: Coleoptera
- Suborder: Polyphaga
- Infraorder: Cucujiformia
- Family: Cerambycidae
- Genus: Phytoecia
- Species: P. collaris

Binomial name
- Phytoecia collaris (Pascoe, 1817)

Synonyms
- Nitocris rubricollis Peringuey, 1888; Blepisanis collaris Pascoe, 1817

Species of beetle

Phytoecia collaris is a species of beetle in the family Cerambycidae. It was described by Francis Polkinghorne Pascoe in 1817, originally under the genus Blepisanis.
