= Phytoecia rufa =

Scientific classification
- Kingdom: Animalia
- Phylum: Arthropoda
- Class: Insecta
- Order: Coleoptera
- Suborder: Polyphaga
- Infraorder: Cucujiformia
- Family: Cerambycidae
- Genus: Phytoecia
- Species: P. rufa

Binomial name
- Phytoecia rufa Breuning, 1950

Species of beetle

Phytoecia rufa is a species of beetle in the family Cerambycidae. It was described by Stephan von Breuning in 1950.

== Subspecies ==
- Phytoecia rufa rufa Breuning, 1950
- Phytoecia rufa allardi Breuning, 1974
