= Phytoecia tauricola =

Scientific classification
- Kingdom: Animalia
- Phylum: Arthropoda
- Clade: Pancrustacea
- Class: Insecta
- Order: Coleoptera
- Suborder: Polyphaga
- Infraorder: Cucujiformia
- Family: Cerambycidae
- Genus: Phytoecia
- Species: P. tauricola

Binomial name
- Phytoecia tauricola (Breuning, 1943)

Synonyms
- Conizonia tauricola Breuning, 1943; Coptosia tauricola (Breuning, 1943)

Species of beetle

Phytoecia tauricola is a species of beetle in the family Cerambycidae. It was described by Stephan von Breuning in 1943. It is known from the Taurus Mountains in eastern Turkey.

Phytoecia tauricola measure 6.5 mm (0.26 in).
