= Phytoecia serriventris =

Scientific classification
- Domain: Eukaryota
- Kingdom: Animalia
- Phylum: Arthropoda
- Class: Insecta
- Order: Coleoptera
- Suborder: Polyphaga
- Infraorder: Cucujiformia
- Family: Cerambycidae
- Genus: Phytoecia
- Species: P. serriventris

Binomial name
- Phytoecia serriventris Holzschuh, 1984

Synonyms
- Pilemia serriventris (Holzschuh, 1984)

Species of beetle

Phytoecia serriventris is a species of beetle in the family Cerambycidae. It was described by Holzschuh in 1984. It is known from Bulgaria.
