= Phytoecia vaulogeri =

Scientific classification
- Kingdom: Animalia
- Phylum: Arthropoda
- Class: Insecta
- Order: Coleoptera
- Suborder: Polyphaga
- Infraorder: Cucujiformia
- Family: Cerambycidae
- Genus: Phytoecia
- Species: P. vaulogeri

Binomial name
- Phytoecia vaulogeri Pic, 1892

Species of beetle

Phytoecia vaulogeri is a species of beetle in the family Cerambycidae. It was described by Maurice Pic in 1892. It is known from Algeria. It contains the varietas Phytoecia vaulogeri var. lucasi.
