= Phytoecia adusta =

Scientific classification
- Kingdom: Animalia
- Phylum: Arthropoda
- Class: Insecta
- Order: Coleoptera
- Suborder: Polyphaga
- Infraorder: Cucujiformia
- Family: Cerambycidae
- Genus: Phytoecia
- Species: P. adusta

Binomial name
- Phytoecia adusta Reitter, 1889

Synonyms
- Musaria (Semiangusta) adusta (Reitter) Pic, 1892

Species of beetle

Phytoecia adusta is a species of beetle in the family Cerambycidae. It was described by Reitter in 1889. It is known from Armenia.
