= Phytoecia angusta =

Scientific classification
- Domain: Eukaryota
- Kingdom: Animalia
- Phylum: Arthropoda
- Class: Insecta
- Order: Coleoptera
- Suborder: Polyphaga
- Infraorder: Cucujiformia
- Family: Cerambycidae
- Genus: Phytoecia
- Species: P. angusta

Binomial name
- Phytoecia angusta (Aurivillius, 1914)

Synonyms
- Blepisanis cyanea Hintz, 1919; Blepisanis angusta Aurivillius, 1914

Species of beetle

Phytoecia angusta is a species of beetle in the family Cerambycidae. It was described by Per Olof Christopher Aurivillius in 1914, originally under the genus Blepisanis.
