= Phytoecia vulneris =

Scientific classification
- Domain: Eukaryota
- Kingdom: Animalia
- Phylum: Arthropoda
- Class: Insecta
- Order: Coleoptera
- Suborder: Polyphaga
- Infraorder: Cucujiformia
- Family: Cerambycidae
- Genus: Phytoecia
- Species: P. vulneris

Binomial name
- Phytoecia vulneris Aurivillius, 1923

Synonyms
- Phytoecia paganettii Breuning, 1944

Species of beetle

Phytoecia vulneris is a species of beetle in the family Cerambycidae. It was described by Per Olof Christopher Aurivillius in 1923.

== Subspecies ==
- Phytoecia vulneris vulneris Aurivillius, 1923
- Phytoecia vulneris eremita Sama, 1999
