= Phytoecia cylindricollis =

Scientific classification
- Domain: Eukaryota
- Kingdom: Animalia
- Phylum: Arthropoda
- Class: Insecta
- Order: Coleoptera
- Suborder: Polyphaga
- Infraorder: Cucujiformia
- Family: Cerambycidae
- Genus: Phytoecia
- Species: P. cylindricollis

Binomial name
- Phytoecia cylindricollis (Kolbe, 1893)

Synonyms
- Blepisanis geniculata Kolbe, 1873 nec Mulsant, 1863; Blepisanis cylindricollis Kolbe, 1893; Blepisanis flaviceps Aurivillius, 1925; Phytoecia kolbei Breuning, 1951; Phytoecia kolbei m. rubriscapa Breuning, 1970; Phytoecia kolbei var. fuscibasicornis Lepesme, 1952

Species of beetle

Phytoecia cylindricollis is a species of beetle in the family Cerambycidae. It was described by Hermann Julius Kolbe in 1893, originally under the genus Blepisanis. It is known from the Ivory Coast, the Democratic Republic of the Congo, Ghana, Guinea, Benin, Gabon, and Togo.

== Subspecies ==
- Phytoecia cylindricollis subternigra Breuning, 1950
- Phytoecia cylindricollis cylindricollis (Kolbe, 1893)
