= Phytoecia farinosa =

Scientific classification
- Domain: Eukaryota
- Kingdom: Animalia
- Phylum: Arthropoda
- Class: Insecta
- Order: Coleoptera
- Suborder: Polyphaga
- Infraorder: Cucujiformia
- Family: Cerambycidae
- Genus: Phytoecia
- Species: P. farinosa

Binomial name
- Phytoecia farinosa Ganglbauer, 1885

Synonyms
- Pseudomusaria mucida (Ganglbauer) Villiers, 1967; Pseudomusaria farinosa (Ganglbauer) Villiers, 1967; Phytoecia mucida Semenov, 1893

Species of beetle

Phytoecia farinosa is a species of beetle in the family Cerambycidae. It was described by Ganglbauer in 1885. It is known from Turkmenistan and Iran.
