= Phytoecia somereni =

Scientific classification
- Kingdom: Animalia
- Phylum: Arthropoda
- Class: Insecta
- Order: Coleoptera
- Suborder: Polyphaga
- Infraorder: Cucujiformia
- Family: Cerambycidae
- Genus: Phytoecia
- Species: P. somereni

Binomial name
- Phytoecia somereni Breuning, 1951

Species of beetle

Phytoecia somereni is a species of beetle in the family Cerambycidae. It was described by Stephan von Breuning in 1951. It is known from Kenya.
