= Phytoecia alinae =

Scientific classification
- Kingdom: Animalia
- Phylum: Arthropoda
- Class: Insecta
- Order: Coleoptera
- Suborder: Polyphaga
- Infraorder: Cucujiformia
- Family: Cerambycidae
- Genus: Phytoecia
- Species: P. alinae

Binomial name
- Phytoecia alinae Kasatkin, 2011

Species of beetle

Phytoecia alinae is a species of beetle in the family Cerambycidae. It was described by Kasatkin in 2011. It is known from Turkey.
