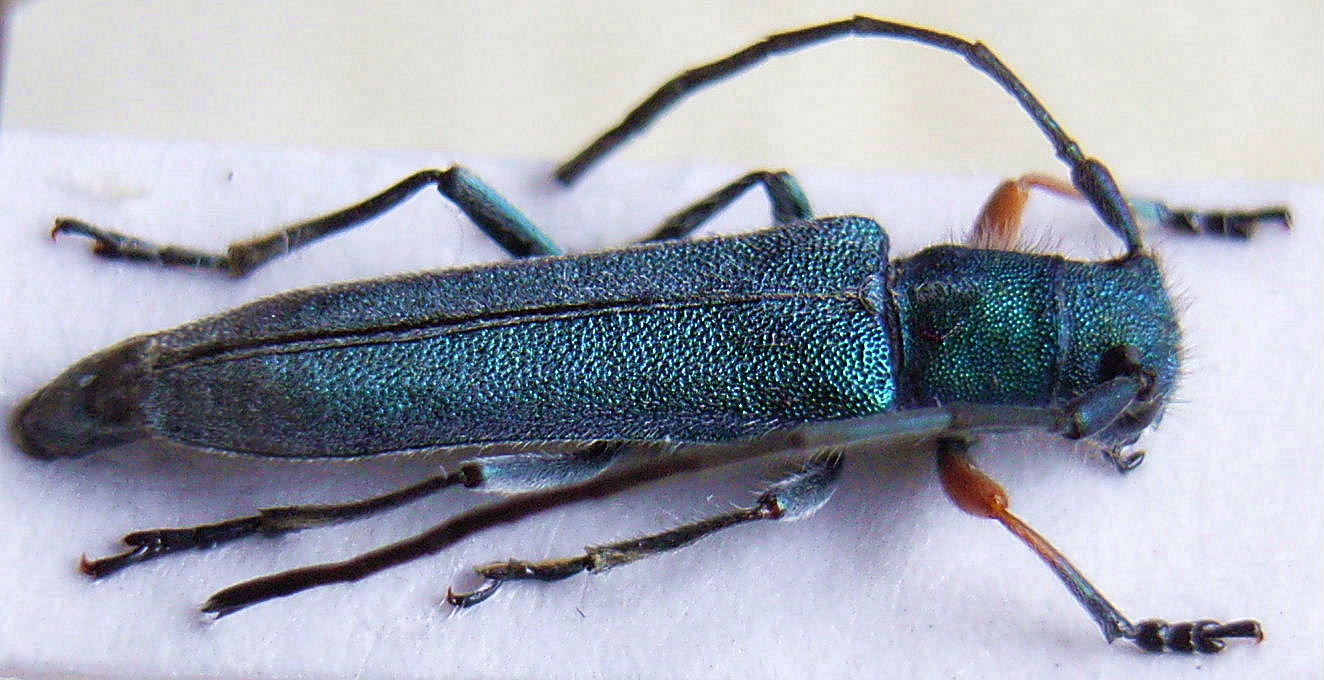
- A blue specimen. Green or gray morphs are also found.

Scientific classification
- Domain: Eukaryota
- Kingdom: Animalia
- Phylum: Arthropoda
- Class: Insecta
- Order: Coleoptera
- Suborder: Polyphaga
- Infraorder: Cucujiformia
- Family: Cerambycidae
- Genus: Phytoecia
- Species: P. caerulea

Binomial name
- Phytoecia caerulea (Scopoli, 1772)

Synonyms
- Phytoecia rufimana (Schrank) Villiers, 1974; Phytoecia flavimana (Creutzer) Méquignon, 1907; Phytoecia coerulea (Scopoli); Leptura caerulea Scopoli, 1772; Saperda flavimana Creutzer, 1796; Saperda rufimana Schrank, 1789; Saperda coelestis Townson, 1797

= Phytoecia caerulea =

Species of beetle

Phytoecia caerulea is a species of beetle in the family Cerambycidae. It was described by Scopoli in 1772, originally under the genus Leptura. It has a wide distribution in Europe.

== Subspecies ==
- Phytoecia caerulea caerulea (Scopoli, 1772)
- Phytoecia caerulea bethseba Reiche & Saulcy, 1858
- Phytoecia caerulea gilvimana Ménétriés, 1832
