= Phytoecia sublateralis =

Scientific classification
- Kingdom: Animalia
- Phylum: Arthropoda
- Class: Insecta
- Order: Coleoptera
- Suborder: Polyphaga
- Infraorder: Cucujiformia
- Family: Cerambycidae
- Genus: Phytoecia
- Species: P. sublateralis

Binomial name
- Phytoecia sublateralis Breuning, 1950

Synonyms
- Phytoecia (Blepisanis) sublateralis m. rubroscapa Téocchi, 1989

Species of beetle

Phytoecia sublateralis is a species of beetle in the family Cerambycidae. It was described by Stephan von Breuning in 1950.
