= Phytoecia gougeleti =

Scientific classification
- Kingdom: Animalia
- Phylum: Arthropoda
- Class: Insecta
- Order: Coleoptera
- Suborder: Polyphaga
- Infraorder: Cucujiformia
- Family: Cerambycidae
- Genus: Phytoecia
- Species: P. gougeleti

Binomial name
- Phytoecia gougeleti Fairmaire, 1880

Species of beetle

Phytoecia gougeleti is a species of beetle in the family Cerambycidae. It was described by Léon Fairmaire in 1880. It is known from Algeria.
