= Phytoecia ferrea =

Scientific classification
- Domain: Eukaryota
- Kingdom: Animalia
- Phylum: Arthropoda
- Class: Insecta
- Order: Coleoptera
- Suborder: Polyphaga
- Infraorder: Cucujiformia
- Family: Cerambycidae
- Genus: Phytoecia
- Species: P. ferrea

Binomial name
- Phytoecia ferrea Ganglbauer, 1887

Synonyms
- Phytoecia cylindrica var. ferrea Ganglbauer, 1887; Phytoecia analis var. atropygidialis Pic, 1939; Phytoecia analis Mannerheim, 1849 nec Fabricius, 1781; Phytoecia mannerheimi Breuning, 1951

Species of beetle

Phytoecia ferrea is a species of beetle in the family Cerambycidae. It was described by Ganglbauer in 1887, originally as a varietas of the species Phytoecia cylindrica. It is known from Russia, China and Mongolia.
