= Phytoecia aspericollis =

Scientific classification
- Domain: Eukaryota
- Kingdom: Animalia
- Phylum: Arthropoda
- Class: Insecta
- Order: Coleoptera
- Suborder: Polyphaga
- Infraorder: Cucujiformia
- Family: Cerambycidae
- Genus: Phytoecia
- Species: P. aspericollis

Binomial name
- Phytoecia aspericollis Holzschuh, 1981

Synonyms
- Opsilia aspericollis (Holzschuh, 1981)

Species of beetle

Phytoecia aspericollis is a species of beetle in the family Cerambycidae. It was described by Holzschuh in 1981.
