= Phytoecia faldermanni =

Scientific classification
- Domain: Eukaryota
- Kingdom: Animalia
- Phylum: Arthropoda
- Class: Insecta
- Order: Coleoptera
- Suborder: Polyphaga
- Infraorder: Cucujiformia
- Family: Cerambycidae
- Genus: Phytoecia
- Species: P. faldermanni

Binomial name
- Phytoecia faldermanni Faldermann, 1837

Synonyms
- Musaria faldermanni (Faldermann, 1837)

Species of beetle

Phytoecia faldermanni is a species of beetle in the family Cerambycidae. It was described by Faldermann in 1837. It is known from Russia, Azerbaijan, Kazakhstan, Armenia, Georgia, and Ukraine.
