= Phytoecia chehirensis =

Scientific classification
- Kingdom: Animalia
- Phylum: Arthropoda
- Clade: Pancrustacea
- Class: Insecta
- Order: Coleoptera
- Suborder: Polyphaga
- Infraorder: Cucujiformia
- Family: Cerambycidae
- Genus: Phytoecia
- Species: P. chehirensis

Binomial name
- Phytoecia chehirensis (Breuning, 1943)

Synonyms
- Conizonia chehirensis Breuning, 1943; Coptosia chehirensis (Breuning, 1943); Phytoecia (Barbarina) chehirensis (Breuning, 1943)

Species of beetle

Phytoecia chehirensis is a species of beetle in the family Cerambycidae. It was first described by Stephan von Breuning in 1943, originally under the genus Conizonia. It is known from Anatolia (Turkey).

Phytoecia chehirensis measure 10–14 mm (0.39–0.55 in).
