= Phytoecia dantchenkoi =

Scientific classification
- Domain: Eukaryota
- Kingdom: Animalia
- Phylum: Arthropoda
- Class: Insecta
- Order: Coleoptera
- Suborder: Polyphaga
- Infraorder: Cucujiformia
- Family: Cerambycidae
- Genus: Phytoecia
- Species: P. dantchenkoi

Binomial name
- Phytoecia dantchenkoi Danilevsky, 2008

Species of beetle

Phytoecia dantchenkoi is a species of beetle in the family Cerambycidae. It was described by Mikhail Leontievich Danilevsky in 2008. It is known from Armenia.
