= Phytoecia badenkoi =

Scientific classification
- Domain: Eukaryota
- Kingdom: Animalia
- Phylum: Arthropoda
- Class: Insecta
- Order: Coleoptera
- Suborder: Polyphaga
- Infraorder: Cucujiformia
- Family: Cerambycidae
- Genus: Phytoecia
- Species: P. badenkoi

Binomial name
- Phytoecia badenkoi Danilevsky, 1988

Synonyms
- Opsilia badenkoi (Danilevsky, 1988)

Species of beetle

Phytoecia badenkoi is a species of beetle in the family Cerambycidae. It was described by Mikhail Leontievich Danilevsky in 1988.
