= Phytoecia affinis =

Scientific classification
- Domain: Eukaryota
- Kingdom: Animalia
- Phylum: Arthropoda
- Class: Insecta
- Order: Coleoptera
- Suborder: Polyphaga
- Infraorder: Cucujiformia
- Family: Cerambycidae
- Genus: Phytoecia
- Species: P. affinis

Binomial name
- Phytoecia affinis (Harrer, 1784)

Synonyms
- Leptura nigripes Voet, 1778 nec De Geer, 1775; Leptura affinis Harrer, 1784; Cerambyx bipunctatus Piller & Mitterpacher, 1783 nec Drury, 1773; Phytoecia nigripes (Voet, 1778); Musaria affinis (Harrer, 1784); Musaria nigripes (Voet, 1778); Saperda affinis (Harrer, 1784); Saperda haemorrhoidalis Fabricius, 1792; Saperda nigritarsis Schönherr, 1817; Saperda janus Frölich, 1793

Species of beetle

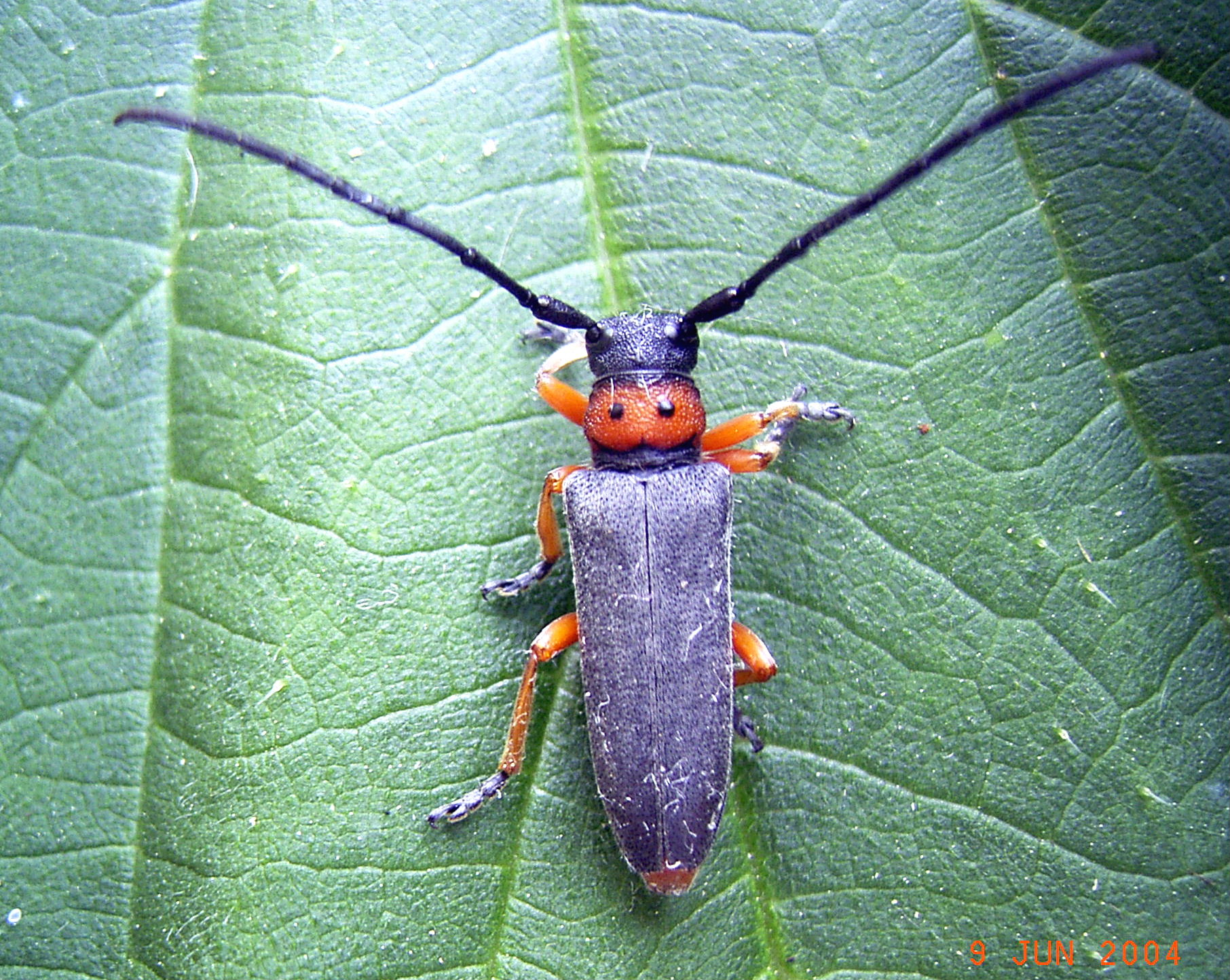
Phytoecia affinis (synonym Phytocea nigripes)

Phytoecia affinis is a species of beetle in the family Cerambycidae. It was described by Harrer in 1784, originally under the genus Leptura. It has a wide distribution in Europe.

== Subspecies ==
- Phytoecia affinis boeberi Ganglbauer, 1883
- Phytoecia affinis nigropubescens Reitter, 1888
- Phytoecia affinis altaica Suvorov, 1913
- Phytoecia affinis volgensis Kraatz, 1883
- Phytoecia affinis tuerki Ganglbauer, 1883
- Phytoecia affinis affinis (Harrer, 1784)
