= Phytoecia sibirica =

Scientific classification
- Domain: Eukaryota
- Kingdom: Animalia
- Phylum: Arthropoda
- Class: Insecta
- Order: Coleoptera
- Suborder: Polyphaga
- Infraorder: Cucujiformia
- Family: Cerambycidae
- Genus: Phytoecia
- Species: P. sibirica

Binomial name
- Phytoecia sibirica (Gebler, 1842)

Synonyms
- Saperda sibirica Gebler, 1842

Species of beetle

Phytoecia sibirica is a species of beetle in the family Cerambycidae. It was described by Gebler in 1842. It is known from Russia, Kazakhstan, and Ukraine.
