= Phytoecia aurivilli =

Scientific classification
- Kingdom: Animalia
- Phylum: Arthropoda
- Class: Insecta
- Order: Coleoptera
- Suborder: Polyphaga
- Infraorder: Cucujiformia
- Family: Cerambycidae
- Genus: Phytoecia
- Species: P. aurivilli

Binomial name
- Phytoecia aurivilli Breuning, 1951

Synonyms
- Blepisanis coerulea Aurivillius, 1908 nec Scopoli, 1772

Species of beetle

Phytoecia aurivilli is a species of beetle in the family Cerambycidae. It was described by Stephan von Breuning in 1951.
