= Phytoecia cincticollis =

Scientific classification
- Domain: Eukaryota
- Kingdom: Animalia
- Phylum: Arthropoda
- Class: Insecta
- Order: Coleoptera
- Suborder: Polyphaga
- Infraorder: Cucujiformia
- Family: Cerambycidae
- Genus: Phytoecia
- Species: P. cincticollis

Binomial name
- Phytoecia cincticollis (Aurivillius, 1925)

Synonyms
- Blepisanis cincticollis Aurivillius, 1925

Species of beetle

Phytoecia cincticollis is a species of beetle in the family Cerambycidae. It was described by Per Olof Christopher Aurivillius in 1925. It is known from Kenya.
