= Phytoecia vagecarinata =

Scientific classification
- Kingdom: Animalia
- Phylum: Arthropoda
- Class: Insecta
- Order: Coleoptera
- Suborder: Polyphaga
- Infraorder: Cucujiformia
- Family: Cerambycidae
- Genus: Phytoecia
- Species: P. vagecarinata

Binomial name
- Phytoecia vagecarinata (Pic, 1952)

Synonyms
- Pilemia vagecarinata Pic, 1952

Species of beetle

Phytoecia vagecarinata is a species of beetle in the family Cerambycidae. It was described by Maurice Pic in 1952. It is known from Syria.
