= Phytoecia pallidipennis =

Scientific classification
- Domain: Eukaryota
- Kingdom: Animalia
- Phylum: Arthropoda
- Class: Insecta
- Order: Coleoptera
- Suborder: Polyphaga
- Infraorder: Cucujiformia
- Family: Cerambycidae
- Genus: Phytoecia
- Species: P. pallidipennis

Binomial name
- Phytoecia pallidipennis Plavilstshikov, 1926

Species of beetle

Phytoecia pallidipennis is a species of beetle in the family Cerambycidae. It was described by Nikolay Nikolaevich Plavilstshchikov in 1926. It is known from Kazakhstan.
