= Phytoecia melanocephala =

Scientific classification
- Kingdom: Animalia
- Phylum: Arthropoda
- Clade: Pancrustacea
- Class: Insecta
- Order: Coleoptera
- Suborder: Polyphaga
- Infraorder: Cucujiformia
- Family: Cerambycidae
- Genus: Phytoecia
- Species: P. melanocephala

Binomial name
- Phytoecia melanocephala (Fabricius, 1787)

Synonyms
- Saperda melanocephala Fabricius, 1787; Blepisanis melanocephala (Fabricius) Sama, 1988; Phytoecia rubricollis Lucas, 1849

Species of beetle

Phytoecia melanocephala is a species of beetle in the family Cerambycidae. It was described by Johan Christian Fabricius in 1787, originally under the genus Saperda. It is known from Morocco, Libya, Algeria, Sicily, and Tunisia.
