= Phytoecia erythaca =

Scientific classification
- Domain: Eukaryota
- Kingdom: Animalia
- Phylum: Arthropoda
- Class: Insecta
- Order: Coleoptera
- Suborder: Polyphaga
- Infraorder: Cucujiformia
- Family: Cerambycidae
- Genus: Phytoecia
- Species: P. erythaca

Binomial name
- Phytoecia erythaca (Pascoe, 1858)

Synonyms
- Saperda erythaca Pascoe, 1858; Blepisanis rufipennis Aurivillius, 1925

Species of beetle

Phytoecia erythaca is a species of beetle in the family Cerambycidae. It was described by Francis Polkinghorne Pascoe in 1858, originally under the genus Saperda.
