= Phytoecia nigroapicalis =

Scientific classification
- Kingdom: Animalia
- Phylum: Arthropoda
- Class: Insecta
- Order: Coleoptera
- Suborder: Polyphaga
- Infraorder: Cucujiformia
- Family: Cerambycidae
- Genus: Phytoecia
- Species: P. nigroapicalis

Binomial name
- Phytoecia nigroapicalis Breuning, 1944

Synonyms
- Helladia pretiosa (Faldermann); Helladia pretiosia ninives Sama, 1994; Phytoecia (Helladia) pretiosa nigroapicalis Breuning, 1944

Species of beetle

Phytoecia nigroapicalis is a species of beetle in the family Cerambycidae. It was described by Stephan von Breuning in 1944. It is known from Iraq.
