= Phytoecia breverufonotata =

Scientific classification
- Kingdom: Animalia
- Phylum: Arthropoda
- Class: Insecta
- Order: Coleoptera
- Suborder: Polyphaga
- Infraorder: Cucujiformia
- Family: Cerambycidae
- Genus: Phytoecia
- Species: P. breverufonotata

Binomial name
- Phytoecia breverufonotata (Pic, 1952)

Synonyms
- Pilemia breverufonotata Pic, 1952; Phytoecia maculifera Holzschuh, 1984

Species of beetle

Phytoecia breverufonotata is a species of beetle in the family Cerambycidae. It was described by Maurice Pic in 1952. It is known from Turkey.
