= Phytoecia sareptana =

Scientific classification
- Kingdom: Animalia
- Phylum: Arthropoda
- Class: Insecta
- Order: Coleoptera
- Suborder: Polyphaga
- Infraorder: Cucujiformia
- Family: Cerambycidae
- Genus: Phytoecia
- Species: P. sareptana

Binomial name
- Phytoecia sareptana Ganglbauer, 1888

Synonyms
- Phytoecia densepubens Gressitt, 1951

Species of beetle

Phytoecia sareptana is a species of beetle in the family Cerambycidae. It was described by Ganglbauer in 1888. It is known from China and Russian Far East.
