= Phytoecia asiatica =

Scientific classification
- Kingdom: Animalia
- Phylum: Arthropoda
- Class: Insecta
- Order: Coleoptera
- Suborder: Polyphaga
- Infraorder: Cucujiformia
- Family: Cerambycidae
- Genus: Phytoecia
- Species: P. asiatica

Binomial name
- Phytoecia asiatica Pic, 1892

Synonyms
- Phytoecia geniculata m. asiatica Pic, 1892; Phytoecia achilleae Holzschuh, 1971

Species of beetle

Phytoecia asiatica is a species of beetle in the family Cerambycidae. It was described by Maurice Pic in 1892. It is known from Turkey and Armenia.

== Subspecies ==
- Phytoecia asiatica sublineata Holzschuh, 1984
- Phytoecia asiatica asiatica Pic, 1892
