= Phytoecia remaudierei =

Scientific classification
- Kingdom: Animalia
- Phylum: Arthropoda
- Class: Insecta
- Order: Coleoptera
- Suborder: Polyphaga
- Infraorder: Cucujiformia
- Family: Cerambycidae
- Genus: Phytoecia
- Species: P. remaudierei

Binomial name
- Phytoecia remaudierei (Villiers, 1967)

Synonyms
- Blepisanis remaudierei Villiers, 1967

Species of beetle

Phytoecia remaudierei is a species of beetle in the family Cerambycidae. It was described by Villiers in 1967. It is known from Iran.
