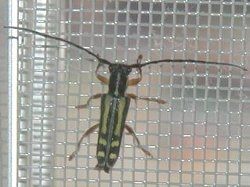

Scientific classification
- Domain: Eukaryota
- Kingdom: Animalia
- Phylum: Arthropoda
- Class: Insecta
- Order: Coleoptera
- Suborder: Polyphaga
- Infraorder: Cucujiformia
- Family: Cerambycidae
- Genus: Phytoecia
- Species: P. comes

Binomial name
- Phytoecia comes (Bates, 1884)

Synonyms
- Epiglenea comes Bates, 1884

= Phytoecia comes =

Species of beetle

Phytoecia comes is a species of beetle in the family Cerambycidae. It was described by Henry Walter Bates in 1884. It is known from Taiwan, Myanmar, North Korea, South Korea, China, Vietnam, and Japan.

== Subspecies ==
- Phytoecia comes comes Bates, 1884
- Phytoecia comes amoena Gahan, 1894
- Phytoecia comes zetschuanica Breuning, 1967

== Varietas ==
- Epiglenea comes var. luteodiversa Pic, 1926
- Epiglenea comes var. griseopubescens (Breuning, 1951)
- Epiglenea comes var. formosana (Schwarzer, 1925)
- Epiglenea comes var. ohbayashii Heyrovsky, 1952
