= Phytoecia plasoni =

Scientific classification
- Domain: Eukaryota
- Kingdom: Animalia
- Phylum: Arthropoda
- Class: Insecta
- Order: Coleoptera
- Suborder: Polyphaga
- Infraorder: Cucujiformia
- Family: Cerambycidae
- Genus: Phytoecia
- Species: P. plasoni

Binomial name
- Phytoecia plasoni Ganglbauer, 1884

Synonyms
- Musaria plasoni (Ganglbauer, 1884)

Species of beetle

Phytoecia plasoni is a species of beetle in the family Cerambycidae. It was described by Ganglbauer in 1884. It is known from Turkey, Armenia and Iran.
