= Phytoecia aenigmatica =

Scientific classification
- Domain: Eukaryota
- Kingdom: Animalia
- Phylum: Arthropoda
- Class: Insecta
- Order: Coleoptera
- Suborder: Polyphaga
- Infraorder: Cucujiformia
- Family: Cerambycidae
- Genus: Phytoecia
- Species: P. aenigmatica

Binomial name
- Phytoecia aenigmatica Sama, Rapuzzi & Rejzek, 2007

Species of beetle

Phytoecia aenigmatica is a species of beetle in the family Cerambycidae. It was described by Sama, Rapuzzi and Rejzek in 2007.
