= Phytoecia ruficollis =

Scientific classification
- Domain: Eukaryota
- Kingdom: Animalia
- Phylum: Arthropoda
- Class: Insecta
- Order: Coleoptera
- Suborder: Polyphaga
- Infraorder: Cucujiformia
- Family: Cerambycidae
- Genus: Phytoecia
- Species: P. ruficollis

Binomial name
- Phytoecia ruficollis (Aurivillius, 1914)

Synonyms
- Blepisanis ruficollis Aurivillius, 1914

Species of beetle

Phytoecia ruficollis is a species of beetle in the family Cerambycidae. It was described by Per Olof Christopher Aurivillius in 1914, originally under the genus Blepisanis. It is known from Malawi, the Democratic Republic of the Congo, Mozambique and the Central African Republic.
