= Phytoecia tenuilinea =

Scientific classification
- Kingdom: Animalia
- Phylum: Arthropoda
- Class: Insecta
- Order: Coleoptera
- Suborder: Polyphaga
- Infraorder: Cucujiformia
- Family: Cerambycidae
- Genus: Phytoecia
- Species: P. tenuilinea

Binomial name
- Phytoecia tenuilinea Fairmaire, 1877

Species of beetle

Phytoecia tenuilinea is a species of beetle in the family Cerambycidae. It was described by Léon Fairmaire in 1877. It is known from Morocco and Algeria.

== Subspecies ==
- Phytoecia tenuilinea tenuilinea Fairmaire, 1877
- Phytoecia tenuilinea mateui Breuning, 1951
