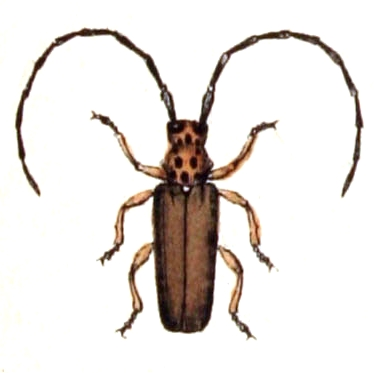

Scientific classification
- Domain: Eukaryota
- Kingdom: Animalia
- Phylum: Arthropoda
- Class: Insecta
- Order: Coleoptera
- Suborder: Polyphaga
- Infraorder: Cucujiformia
- Family: Cerambycidae
- Genus: Phytoecia
- Species: P. argus

Binomial name
- Phytoecia argus (Frölich, 1793)

Synonyms
- Saperda argus Frölich, 1793; Musaria argus (Frölich, 1793)

= Phytoecia argus =

Species of beetle

Phytoecia argus is a species of beetle in the family Cerambycidae. It was described by Frölich in 1793. It has a wide distribution in Europe. It measures between 9 and 21 mm (0.35 and 0.83 in).
