= Phytoecia longicornis =

Scientific classification
- Domain: Eukaryota
- Kingdom: Animalia
- Phylum: Arthropoda
- Class: Insecta
- Order: Coleoptera
- Suborder: Polyphaga
- Infraorder: Cucujiformia
- Family: Cerambycidae
- Genus: Phytoecia
- Species: P. longicornis

Binomial name
- Phytoecia longicornis (Pesarini & Sabbadini, 2009)

Synonyms
- Neomusaria longicornis Pesarini & Sabbadini, 2009

Species of beetle

Phytoecia longicornis is a species of beetle in the family Cerambycidae. It was described by Pesarini and Sabbadini in 2009.
