= Phytoecia rabatensis =

Scientific classification
- Domain: Eukaryota
- Kingdom: Animalia
- Phylum: Arthropoda
- Class: Insecta
- Order: Coleoptera
- Suborder: Polyphaga
- Infraorder: Cucujiformia
- Family: Cerambycidae
- Genus: Phytoecia
- Species: P. rabatensis

Binomial name
- Phytoecia rabatensis Sama, 1992

Species of beetle

Phytoecia rabatensis is a species of beetle in the family Cerambycidae. It was described by Sama in 1992. It is known from North Africa.
