= Phytoecia marki =

Scientific classification
- Domain: Eukaryota
- Kingdom: Animalia
- Phylum: Arthropoda
- Class: Insecta
- Order: Coleoptera
- Suborder: Polyphaga
- Infraorder: Cucujiformia
- Family: Cerambycidae
- Genus: Phytoecia
- Species: P. marki

Binomial name
- Phytoecia marki Plavilstshikov, 2008

Species of beetle

Phytoecia marki is a species of beetle in the family Cerambycidae. It was described by Plavilstshikov in 2008. It is known from Armenia.
