= Phytoecia geniculata =

Scientific classification
- Domain: Eukaryota
- Kingdom: Animalia
- Phylum: Arthropoda
- Class: Insecta
- Order: Coleoptera
- Suborder: Polyphaga
- Infraorder: Cucujiformia
- Family: Cerambycidae
- Genus: Phytoecia
- Species: P. geniculata

Binomial name
- Phytoecia geniculata Mulsant, 1862

Species of beetle

Phytoecia geniculata is a species of beetle in the family Cerambycidae. It was described by Mulsant in 1862. It has a wide distribution between Europe and the Middle East.

== Subspecies ==
- Phytoecia geniculata orientalis Kraatz, 1871
- Phytoecia geniculata geniculata Mulsant, 1862
