= Phytoecia sikkimensis =

Scientific classification
- Kingdom: Animalia
- Phylum: Arthropoda
- Class: Insecta
- Order: Coleoptera
- Suborder: Polyphaga
- Infraorder: Cucujiformia
- Family: Cerambycidae
- Genus: Phytoecia
- Species: P. sikkimensis

Binomial name
- Phytoecia sikkimensis Pic, 1907

Species of beetle

Phytoecia sikkimensis is a species of beetle in the family Cerambycidae. It was described by Maurice Pic in 1907. It is known from India.
