= Phytoecia nepheloides =

Scientific classification
- Kingdom: Animalia
- Phylum: Arthropoda
- Clade: Pancrustacea
- Class: Insecta
- Order: Coleoptera
- Suborder: Polyphaga
- Infraorder: Cucujiformia
- Family: Cerambycidae
- Genus: Phytoecia
- Species: P. nepheloides

Binomial name
- Phytoecia nepheloides Sama, 1997

Synonyms
- Coptosia (Barbarina) nepheloides (Sama, 1997)

Species of beetle

Phytoecia nepheloides is a species of beetle in the family Cerambycidae. It is known from Syria.

Phytoecia nepheloides measure 10 mm (0.39 in).
