= Phytoecia anteatra =

Scientific classification
- Kingdom: Animalia
- Phylum: Arthropoda
- Class: Insecta
- Order: Coleoptera
- Suborder: Polyphaga
- Infraorder: Cucujiformia
- Family: Cerambycidae
- Genus: Phytoecia
- Species: P. anteatra

Binomial name
- Phytoecia anteatra Breuning, 1966

Species of beetle

Phytoecia anteatra is a species of beetle in the family Cerambycidae. It was described by Stephan von Breuning in 1966. It is known from Angola.
