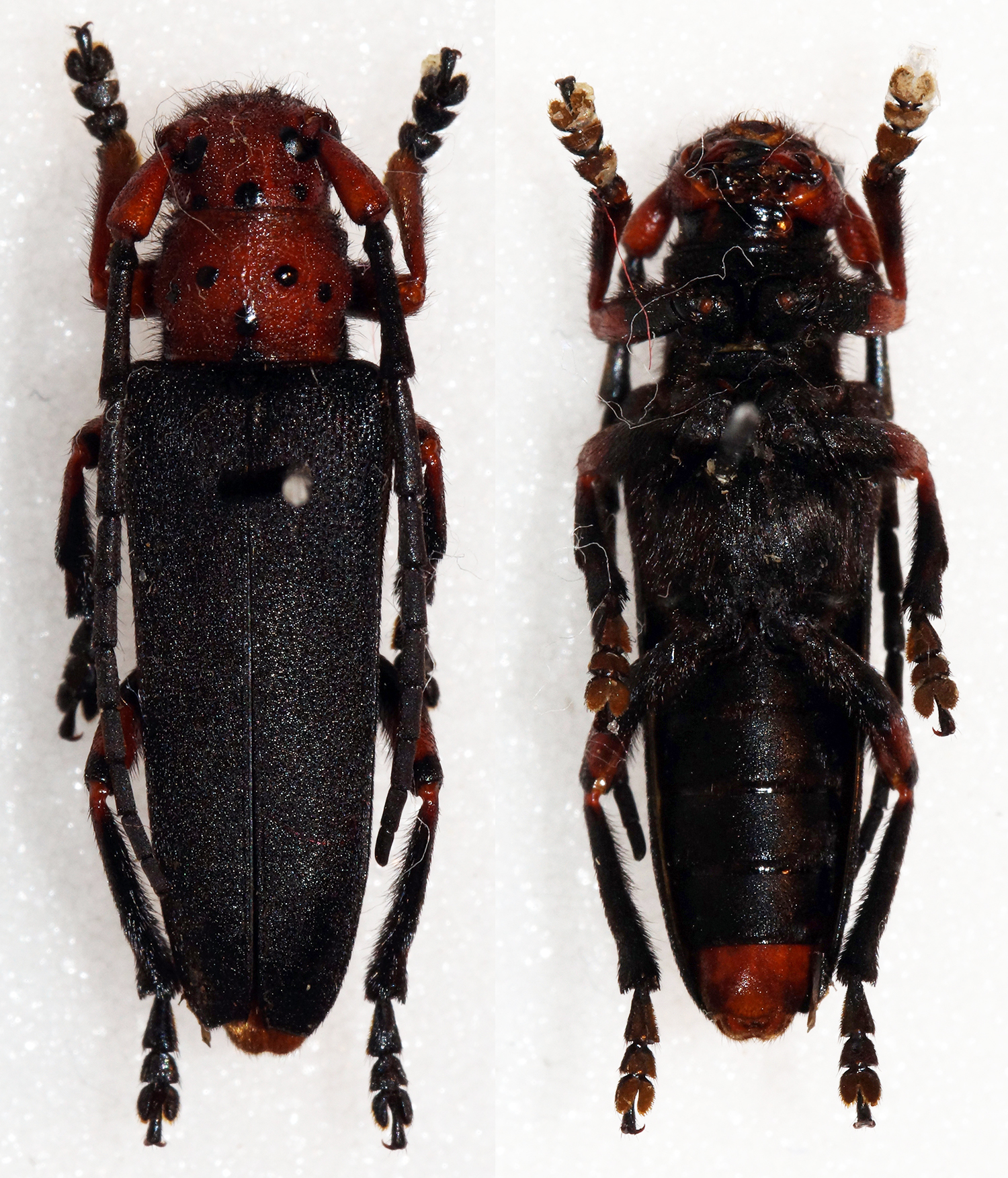

Scientific classification
- Kingdom: Animalia
- Phylum: Arthropoda
- Clade: Pancrustacea
- Class: Insecta
- Order: Coleoptera
- Suborder: Polyphaga
- Infraorder: Cucujiformia
- Family: Cerambycidae
- Genus: Phytoecia
- Species: P. croceipes

Binomial name
- Phytoecia croceipes Reiche & Saulcy, 1858

= Phytoecia croceipes =

Species of beetle

Phytoecia croceipes is a species of beetle in the family Cerambycidae. It was described by Reiche and Saulcy in 1858. It is known from Jordan, Syria, Iraq, Cyprus, Turkey, and Palestine. It contains the varietas Phytoecia croceipes var. annulifer.
