= Phytoecia annulicornis =

Scientific classification
- Domain: Eukaryota
- Kingdom: Animalia
- Phylum: Arthropoda
- Class: Insecta
- Order: Coleoptera
- Suborder: Polyphaga
- Infraorder: Cucujiformia
- Family: Cerambycidae
- Genus: Phytoecia
- Species: P. annulicornis

Binomial name
- Phytoecia annulicornis Reiche, 1877

Species of beetle

Phytoecia annulicornis is a species of beetle in the family Cerambycidae, described by Reiche in 1877. It is known from Spain and Morocco.
