= Phytoecia cinctipennis =

Scientific classification
- Domain: Eukaryota
- Kingdom: Animalia
- Phylum: Arthropoda
- Class: Insecta
- Order: Coleoptera
- Suborder: Polyphaga
- Infraorder: Cucujiformia
- Family: Cerambycidae
- Genus: Phytoecia
- Species: P. cinctipennis

Binomial name
- Phytoecia cinctipennis Mannerheim, 1849

Species of beetle

Phytoecia cinctipennis is a species of beetle in the family Cerambycidae. It was described by Mannerheim in 1849. It is known from Russia, Mongolia, China, and South Korea.

== Subspecies ==
- Phytoecia cinctipennis coreensis Breuning, 1955
- Phytoecia cinctipennis cinctipennis Mannerheim, 1849
