= Phytoecia suvorowi =

Scientific classification
- Kingdom: Animalia
- Phylum: Arthropoda
- Class: Insecta
- Order: Coleoptera
- Suborder: Polyphaga
- Infraorder: Cucujiformia
- Family: Cerambycidae
- Genus: Phytoecia
- Species: P. suvorowi

Binomial name
- Phytoecia suvorowi Pic, 1905

Synonyms
- Phytoecia suworowi (Pic) Koenig, 1906; Phytoecia (Musaria) suvorovi (Pic) Winkler, 1929; Neomusaria suworovi (Pic) Sama, 1993; Neomusaria suvorowi (Pic) Rejzek, Sama & Alziar, 2001; Neomusaria suworowi (Pic) Sama, 1993

Species of beetle

Phytoecia suvorowi is a species of beetle in the family Cerambycidae. It was described by Maurice Pic in 1905. It is known from Azerbaijan, Armenia, and Turkey.
