= Phytoecia ochraceipennis =

Scientific classification
- Domain: Eukaryota
- Kingdom: Animalia
- Phylum: Arthropoda
- Class: Insecta
- Order: Coleoptera
- Suborder: Polyphaga
- Infraorder: Cucujiformia
- Family: Cerambycidae
- Genus: Phytoecia
- Species: P. ochraceipennis

Binomial name
- Phytoecia ochraceipennis Kraatz, 1882

Species of beetle

Phytoecia ochraceipennis is a species of beetle in the family Cerambycidae. It was described by Kraatz in 1882. It is known from Kazakhstan.
