= Phytoecia speciosa =

Scientific classification
- Domain: Eukaryota
- Kingdom: Animalia
- Phylum: Arthropoda
- Class: Insecta
- Order: Coleoptera
- Suborder: Polyphaga
- Infraorder: Cucujiformia
- Family: Cerambycidae
- Genus: Phytoecia
- Species: P. speciosa

Binomial name
- Phytoecia speciosa Frivaldszky, 1884

Synonyms
- Pygoptosia speciosa (Frivaldszky, 1884)

Species of beetle

Phytoecia speciosa is a species of beetle in the family Cerambycidae. It was described by Janos Frivaldszky in 1884. It is known from Turkey and Syria. It feeds on Klasea cerinthifolia.
