= Phytoecia metallescens =

Scientific classification
- Domain: Eukaryota
- Kingdom: Animalia
- Phylum: Arthropoda
- Class: Insecta
- Order: Coleoptera
- Suborder: Polyphaga
- Infraorder: Cucujiformia
- Family: Cerambycidae
- Genus: Phytoecia
- Species: P. metallescens

Binomial name
- Phytoecia metallescens (Aurivillius, 1923)

Synonyms
- Blepisanis metallescens Aurivillius, 1923

Species of beetle

Phytoecia metallescens is a species of beetle in the family Cerambycidae. It was described by Per Olof Christopher Aurivillius in 1923, originally under the genus Blepisanis.
