= Phytoecia minuta =

Scientific classification
- Kingdom: Animalia
- Phylum: Arthropoda
- Class: Insecta
- Order: Coleoptera
- Suborder: Polyphaga
- Infraorder: Cucujiformia
- Family: Cerambycidae
- Genus: Phytoecia
- Species: P. minuta

Binomial name
- Phytoecia minuta Pic, 1892

Synonyms
- Conizonia minuta (Pic, 1954); Coptosia minuta (Pic, 1954)

Species of beetle

Phytoecia minuta is a species of beetle in the family Cerambycidae. It was first described by Maurice Pic in 1892. It is known from Turkey and Syria.
