= Phytoecia beuni =

Scientific classification
- Kingdom: Animalia
- Phylum: Arthropoda
- Class: Insecta
- Order: Coleoptera
- Suborder: Polyphaga
- Infraorder: Cucujiformia
- Family: Cerambycidae
- Genus: Phytoecia
- Species: P. beuni

Binomial name
- Phytoecia beuni Breuning, 1976

Species of beetle

Phytoecia beuni is a species of beetle in the family Cerambycidae. It was described by Stephan von Breuning in 1976. It is known from the Democratic Republic of the Congo.
