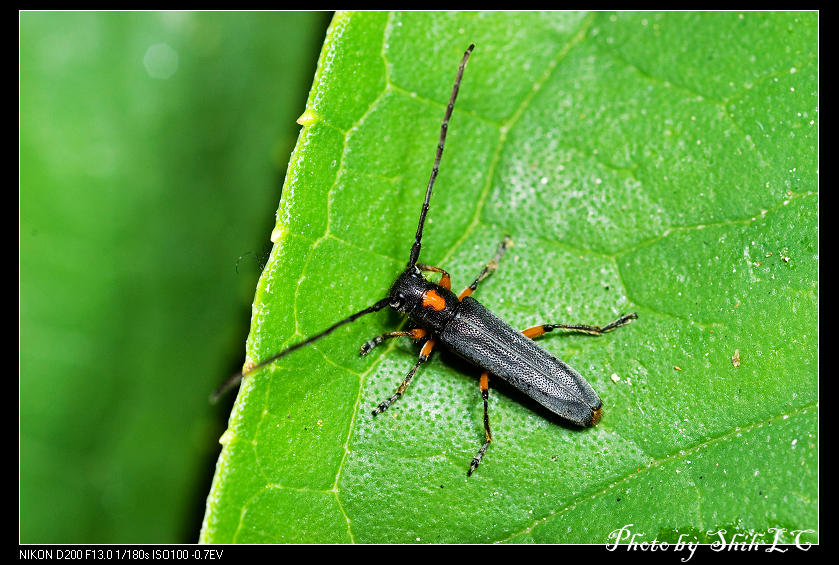

Scientific classification
- Domain: Eukaryota
- Kingdom: Animalia
- Phylum: Arthropoda
- Class: Insecta
- Order: Coleoptera
- Suborder: Polyphaga
- Infraorder: Cucujiformia
- Family: Cerambycidae
- Genus: Phytoecia
- Species: P. rufiventris

Binomial name
- Phytoecia rufiventris Gautier des Cottes, 1870

Synonyms
- Phytoecia punctigera Blessig, 1873; Phytoecia abdominalis Chevrolat, 1882; Phytoecia ventralis Bates, 1873

= Phytoecia rufiventris =

Species of beetle

Phytoecia rufiventris is a species of beetle in the family Cerambycidae. It was described by Gautier des Cottes in 1870. It is known from Russia, Japan, Taiwan, Mongolia, North Korea, South Korea, China, and Vietnam. It feeds on Artemisia vulgaris.

== Varietas ==
- Phytoecia rufiventris var. partenigrescens Breuning, 1947
- Phytoecia rufiventris var. atrimembris Pic, 1915
- Phytoecia rufiventris var. tristigma Pic, 1897
- Phytoecia rufiventris var. tonkinea Pic, 1902
