= Phytoecia hirsutula =

Scientific classification
- Domain: Eukaryota
- Kingdom: Animalia
- Phylum: Arthropoda
- Class: Insecta
- Order: Coleoptera
- Suborder: Polyphaga
- Infraorder: Cucujiformia
- Family: Cerambycidae
- Genus: Phytoecia
- Species: P. hirsutula

Binomial name
- Phytoecia hirsutula (Frölich, 1793)

Synonyms
- Saperda holosericea Faldermann, 1837; Saperda atomaria Townsend, 1797; Saperda hirsutula Frölich, 1793; Pilemia hirsutula (Frölich, 1793)

Species of beetle

Phytoecia hirsutula is a species of beetle in the family Cerambycidae. It was described by Frölich in 1793, originally under the genus Saperda. It has a wide distribution between Europe and the Middle East.

== Subspecies ==
- Phytoecia hirsutula obsoleta (Ganglbauer, 1888)
- Phytoecia hirsutula hirsutula (Frölich, 1793)
- Phytoecia hirsutula homoiesthes Ganglbauer, 1888
