= Phytoecia wachanrui =

Scientific classification
- Domain: Eukaryota
- Kingdom: Animalia
- Phylum: Arthropoda
- Class: Insecta
- Order: Coleoptera
- Suborder: Polyphaga
- Infraorder: Cucujiformia
- Family: Cerambycidae
- Genus: Phytoecia
- Species: P. wachanrui

Binomial name
- Phytoecia wachanrui Mulsant, 1851

Synonyms
- Musaria wachanrui (Mulsant, 1851)

Species of beetle

Phytoecia wachanrui is a species of beetle in the family Cerambycidae. It was described by Étienne Mulsant in 1851. It is known from Jordan, Syria, Lebanon, Iran, and Turkey.
