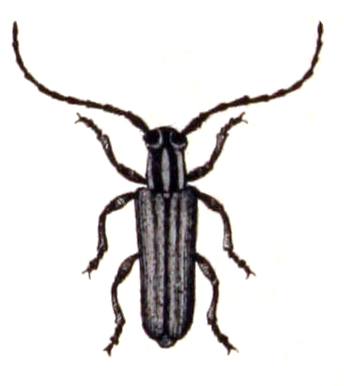
- Phytoecia nigricornis

Scientific classification
- Kingdom: Animalia
- Phylum: Arthropoda
- Clade: Pancrustacea
- Class: Insecta
- Order: Coleoptera
- Suborder: Polyphaga
- Infraorder: Cucujiformia
- Family: Cerambycidae
- Tribe: Saperdini
- Genus: Phytoecia; Dejean, 1835

= Phytoecia =

Genus of beetles

Phytoecia is a genus of longhorn beetles of the subfamily Lamiinae.

== Species ==
subgenus Barbarina Sama, 2010

- Phytoecia behen Sama & Rejzek, 1999
- Phytoecia chehirensis (Breuning, 1943)
- Phytoecia nausicae Rejzek & Kakiopoulos, 2004
- Phytoecia nepheloides Sama, 1997

subgenus Blepisanis

- Phytoecia andreaei Breuning, 1960
- Phytoecia angusta (Aurivillius, 1914)
- Phytoecia anteatra Breuning, 1966
- Phytoecia argenteosuturalis Breuning, 1955
- Phytoecia aterrima Breuning, 1951
- Phytoecia atricollis Breuning, 1954
- Phytoecia aurivilli Breuning, 1951
- Phytoecia basirufipennis Breuning, 1954
- Phytoecia beuni Breuning, 1976
- Phytoecia bohemani (Pascoe, 1858)
- Phytoecia capensis (Péringuey, 1888)
- Phytoecia cincticollis (Aurivillius, 1925)
- Phytoecia collaris (Pascoe, 1817)
- Phytoecia erythaca (Pascoe, 1858)
- Phytoecia fervida (Pascoe, 1871)
- Phytoecia forticornis Breuning, 1946
- Phytoecia holonigra Breuning, 1955
- Phytoecia hovorkai Teocchi & Sudre, 2009
- Phytoecia incallosa (Breuning, 1950)
- Phytoecia incensoides Breuning, 1978
- Phytoecia indica Breuning, 1951
- Phytoecia insignis (Aurivillius, 1914)
- Phytoecia maculicollis (Peringuey, 1888)
- Phytoecia melanocephala (Fabricius, 1787)
- Phytoecia metallescens (Aurivillius, 1923)
- Phytoecia neavei Aurivillius, 1914
- Phytoecia nigrofemorata Breuning, 1946
- Phytoecia nivea Kraatz, 1882
- Phytoecia ochraceipennis Kraatz, 1882
- Phytoecia orientis (Aurivillius, 1908)
- Phytoecia pallidipennis Plavilstshikov, 1926
- Phytoecia povolnyi Heyrovsky, 1971
- Phytoecia pseudolateralis Breuning, 1954
- Phytoecia pseudoruficeps Breuning, 1951
- Phytoecia remaudierei (Villiers, 1967)
- Phytoecia repetkensis Semenov, 1935
- Phytoecia rufa Breuning, 1950
- Phytoecia ruficollis (Aurivillius, 1914)
- Phytoecia seminigripennis Breuning, 1956
- Phytoecia subcoerulea Breuning, 1951
- Phytoecia sublateralis Breuning
- Phytoecia subrufulescens Breuning, 1981
- Phytoecia tatyanae Skrylnik, 2010
- Phytoecia tekensis Semenov, 1896
- Phytoecia vittata (Peringuey, 1888)
- Phytoecia vittipennis Reiche, 1877

subgenus Cardoria

- Phytoecia scutellata (Fabricius, 1793)

subgenus Cinctophytoecia

- Phytoecia albosuturalis Breuning, 1947
- Phytoecia cinctipennis Mannerheim, 1849
- Phytoecia guilleti Pic, 1906
- Phytoecia kukunorensis Breuning, 1943
- Phytoecia punctipennis Breuning, 1947
- Phytoecia sareptana Ganglbauer, 1888
- Phytoecia testaceolimbata Pic, 1933

subgenus Epiglenea

- Phytoecia comes (Bates, 1884)

subgenus Fulgophytoecia

- Phytoecia circumdata Kraatz, 1882
- Phytoecia pilosicollis Holzschuh, 1981
- Phytoecia valentinae Skrylnik, 2010

subgenus Helladia

- Phytoecia armeniaca Frivaldsky, 1878
- Phytoecia demeltiana Lazarev, 2016
- Phytoecia diademata Faldermann, 1837
- Phytoecia ferrugata Ganglbauer, 1884
- Phytoecia flavescens (Brullé, 1833)
- Phytoecia humeralis (Waltl, 1838)
- Phytoecia imperialis (Sama & Rejzek, 2001)
- Phytoecia insignita Chevrolat, 1854
- Phytoecia millefolii (Adams, 1817)
- Phytoecia nigroapicalis Breuning, 1944
- Phytoecia orbicollis Reiche & Saulcy, 1858
- Phytoecia paulusi Holzschuh, 1971
- Phytoecia plasoni Ganglbauer, 1884
- Phytoecia pontica Ganglbauer, 1884
- Phytoecia praetextata (Steven, 1817)
- Phytoecia pretiosa Faldermann, 1837
- Phytoecia testaceovittata (Pic, 1934)

subgenus Kalashania

- Phytoecia erivanica Reitter, 1899
- Phytoecia pici Reitter, 1892
- Phytoecia truncatipennis Pic, 1919

subgenus Metallidia

- Phytoecia alinae Kasatkin, 2011

subgenus Mimocoptosia

- Phytoecia iraniensis Breuning & Villiers, 1972

subgenus Musaria

- Phytoecia affinis (Harrer, 1784)
- Phytoecia anatolica Fuchs & Breuning, 1971
- Phytoecia argus (Frölich, 1793)
- Phytoecia astarte Ganglbauer, 1885
- Phytoecia cephalotes Küster, 1846
- Phytoecia faldermanni Faldermann, 1837
- Phytoecia kurdistana Ganglbauer, 1883
- Phytoecia puncticollis Faldermann, 1837
- Phytoecia rubropunctata (Goeze, 1777)
- Phytoecia tirellii Luigioni, 1913
- Phytoecia wachanrui Mulsant, 1851

subgenus Neomusaria

- Phytoecia adusta Reitter, 1889
- Phytoecia balcanica (Frivaldsky, 1835)
- Phytoecia dantchenkoi Danilevsky, 2008
- Phytoecia latepubens (Pic, 1926)
- Phytoecia longicornis (Pesarini & Sabbadini, 2009)
- Phytoecia merkli Ganglbauer, 1884
- Phytoecia pauliraputii (Sama, 1993)
- Phytoecia salvicola Holzschuh, 1989
- Phytoecia suvorowi Pic, 1905
- Phytoecia waltli (Sama, 1991)

subgenus Opsilia

- Phytoecia aspericollis Holzschuh, 1981
- Phytoecia badenkoi Danilevsky, 1988
- Phytoecia bucharica Breuning, 1943
- Phytoecia caerulescens (Scopoli, 1763)
- Phytoecia chinensis Breuning, 1943
- Phytoecia irakensis Breuning, 1967
- Phytoecia molybdaena (Dalman, 1817)
- Phytoecia prasina Reitter, 1911
- Phytoecia schurmanni Fuchs, 1971
- Phytoecia transcaspica Fuchs, 1955
- Phytoecia uncinata (W. Redtenbacher, 1842)
- Phytoecia varentzovi Semenov, 1896

subgenus Paracoptosia Danilevsky, 2017

- Phytoecia albovittigera Heyden, 1863
- Phytoecia bithynensis Ganglbauer, 1884
- Phytoecia brunnerae (Sama, 2000)
- Phytoecia compacta (Ménétriés, 1832)
- Phytoecia demelti (Breuning, 1973)
- Phytoecia ganglbaueri (Pic, 1936)
- Phytoecia gianassoi (Sama, 2007)
- Phytoecia minuta Pic, 1891
- Phytoecia schuberti (Fuchs, 1965)
- Phytoecia schuleae Özdikmen & Koçak, 2022
- Phytoecia tauricola (Breuning, 1943)
- Phytoecia urartica Kasatkin, 2015

subgenus Parobereina

- Phytoecia pashtunica Larazev, 2019
- Phytoecia heinzi Larazev, 2019

subgenus Phytoecia

- Phytoecia acridula Holzschuh, 1981
- Phytoecia aenigmatica Sama, Rapuzzi & Rejzek, 2007
- Phytoecia algerica Desbrochers, 1870
- Phytoecia annulicornis Reiche, 1877
- Phytoecia asiatica Pic, 1892
- Phytoecia bodemeyeri Reitter, 1913
- Phytoecia caerulea (Scopoli, 1772)
- Phytoecia centaureae Sama, Rapuzzi & Rejzek, 2007
- Phytoecia coeruleomicans Breuning, 1946
- Phytoecia croceipes Reiche & Saulcy, 1858
- Phytoecia cylindrica (Linnaeus, 1758)
- Phytoecia erythrocnema Lucas, 1847
- Phytoecia ferrea Ganglbauer, 1887
- Phytoecia flavipes (Fabricius, 1801)
- Phytoecia gaubilii Mulsant, 1851
- Phytoecia geniculata Mulsant, 1862
- Phytoecia gougeleti Fairmaire, 1880
- Phytoecia icterica (Schaller, 1783)
- Phytoecia kabateki Sama, 1996
- Phytoecia malachitica Lucas, 1849
- Phytoecia manicata Reiche & Saulcy, 1858
- Phytoecia marki Plavilstshikov, 2008
- Phytoecia mongolorum Namhaidorzh, 1979
- Phytoecia nigricornis (Fabricius, 1781)
- Phytoecia pubescens Pic, 1895
- Phytoecia pustulata (Schrank, 1776)
- Phytoecia rabatensis Sama, 1992
- Phytoecia rufipes (Olivier, 1795)
- Phytoecia rufiventris Gautier des Cottes, 1870
- Phytoecia rufovittipennis Breuning, 1971
- Phytoecia sibirica (Gebler, 1842)
- Phytoecia sikkimensis Pic, 1907
- Phytoecia stenostoloides Breuning, 1943
- Phytoecia subannularis Pic, 1901
- Phytoecia tenuilinea Fairmaire, 1877
- Phytoecia vaulogeri Pic, 1892
- Phytoecia virgula (Charpentier, 1825)
- Phytoecia vulneris Aurivillius, 1923

subgenus Pilemia

- Phytoecia angusterufonotata (Pic, 1952)
- Phytoecia annulata Hampe, 1852
- Phytoecia arida Lazarev, 2023
- Phytoecia breverufonotata (Pic, 1952)
- Phytoecia griseomaculata (Pic, 1891)
- Phytoecia halperini Holzschuh, 1999
- Phytoecia hirsutula (Frölich, 1793)
- Phytoecia serriventris Holzschuh, 1984
- Phytoecia smatanai Holzschuh, 2003
- Phytoecia tigrina Mulsant, 1851
- Phytoecia vagecarinata (Pic, 1952)

subgenus Pseudoblepisanis

- Phytoecia analis (Fabricius, 1781)
- Phytoecia atripennis Breuning, 1951
- Phytoecia atrohumeralis Breuning, 1964
- Phytoecia basilevskyi Breuning, 1950
- Phytoecia cylindricollis (Kolbe, 1893)
- Phytoecia fuscolateralis Breuning, 1977
- Phytoecia haroldi (Fahraeus, 1872)
- Phytoecia luteovittigera Pic, 1906
- Phytoecia nigriventris (Kolbe, 1893)
- Phytoecia nigrohumeralis Breuning, 1950
- Phytoecia pseudafricana Breuning, 1951
- Phytoecia pseudosomereni Breuning, 1964
- Phytoecia somereni Breuning, 1951
- Phytoecia sylvatica (Hintz, 1916)

subgenus Pseudomusaria

- Phytoecia farinosa Ganglbauer, 1885

subgenus Pygoptosia

- Phytoecia eugeniae Ganglbauer, 1884
- Phytoecia speciosa Frivaldszky, 1884

subgenus Semiangusta

- Phytoecia delagrangei Pic, 1892
- Phytoecia katarinae Holzschuh, 1974
- Phytoecia rebeccae (Sama & Rejzek, 2002)
