= Armenian medieval sculpture =

Form of medieval art in Armenia

Armenian medieval sculptures are sculptures created in the medieval period. They are most present on or in churches, martyries, and free-standing monuments, such as four-sided stelae and khachkars (cross stones). The popularity of sculpture in the Armenian medieval art was due to midis- a three-layer layout of stones, when two rows of hewn stones were joined with lime mortar, and the surface got an artistic treatment.

The adoption of Christianity by King Trdat (Tiridates) the Great (278–330) in 301, as well as the educational and cultural activities of Gregory the Illuminator, contributed to the building of churches and monasteries, which were decorated with Christian symbols and compositions. The artistic traditions of medieval Armenian sculpture were outlined (4th–5th centuries) and then finally formed (7th century) in the context of Eastern Christian art. No less important was the geographical position of Armenia, between the Byzantine and Sasanian empires, which also outlined the ways of the cultural development of the country.

The academic studies of Armenian medieval sculpture started during the archaeological companies in the historical capital of Ani under the direction of the scholar Nikolai Marr. Later, and especially in the 20th century, the study of Armenian medieval sculpture gained momentum among Armenian and foreign researchers. Although the Armenian sculpture has a wide sphere of expression, the richest are the church buildings. In Armenian churches, sculpture acts as the main element of exterior decoration, and is present in the interior as well. This sculpture tradition, like in the whole Christendom, was formed on the basis of symbolic perceptions about the Church (the Temple of Moses, the Heavenly Jerusalem). The church sculpture was most present on the entrances, windows, and facades. The imagery and symbolism had the meaning and function of communication with god.

== Origins (5th–8th centuries) ==
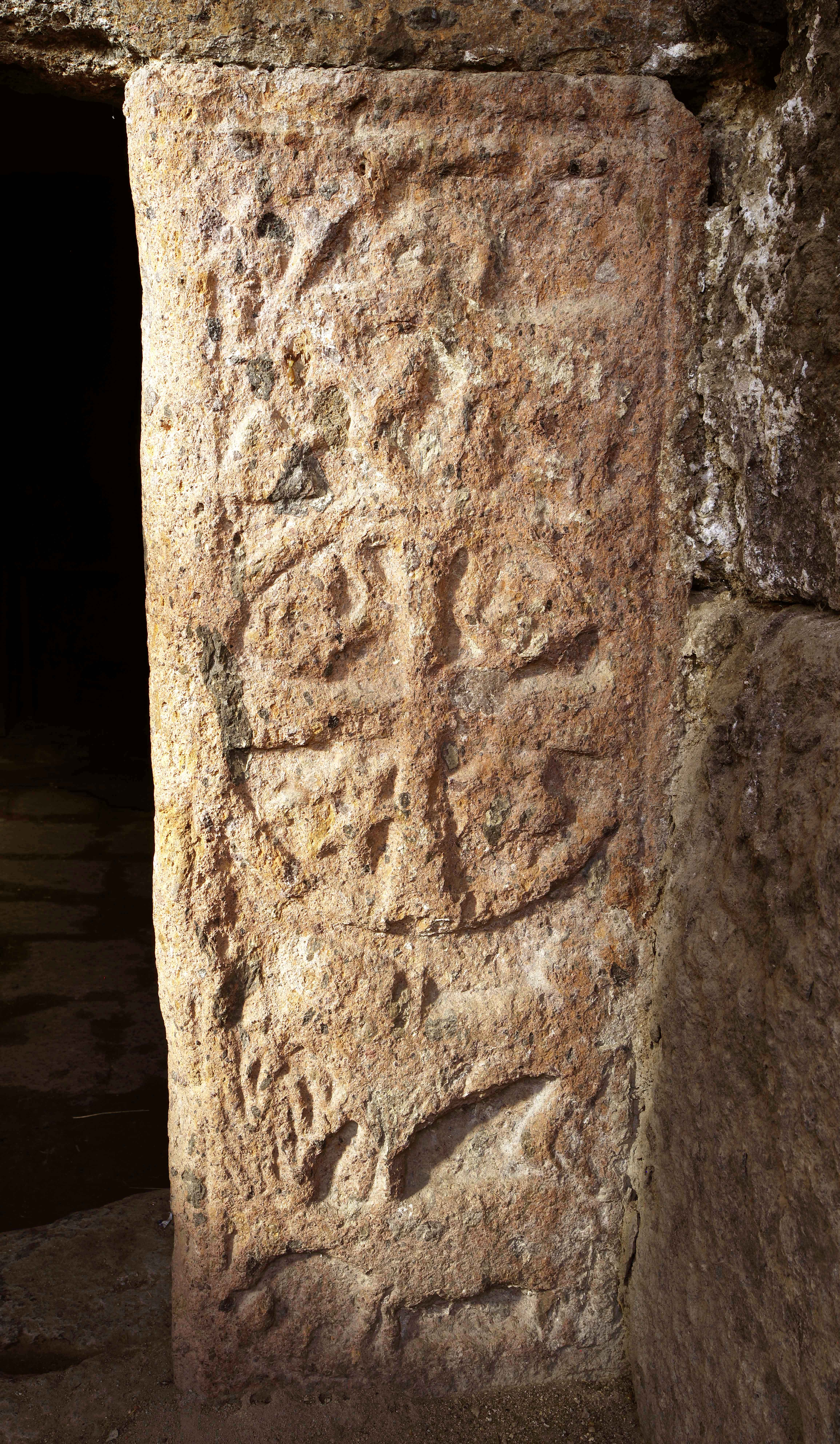
Pillar depicting monogram cross and animal combat in Tomb of the Arshakuni Kings, 4th-5th centuries

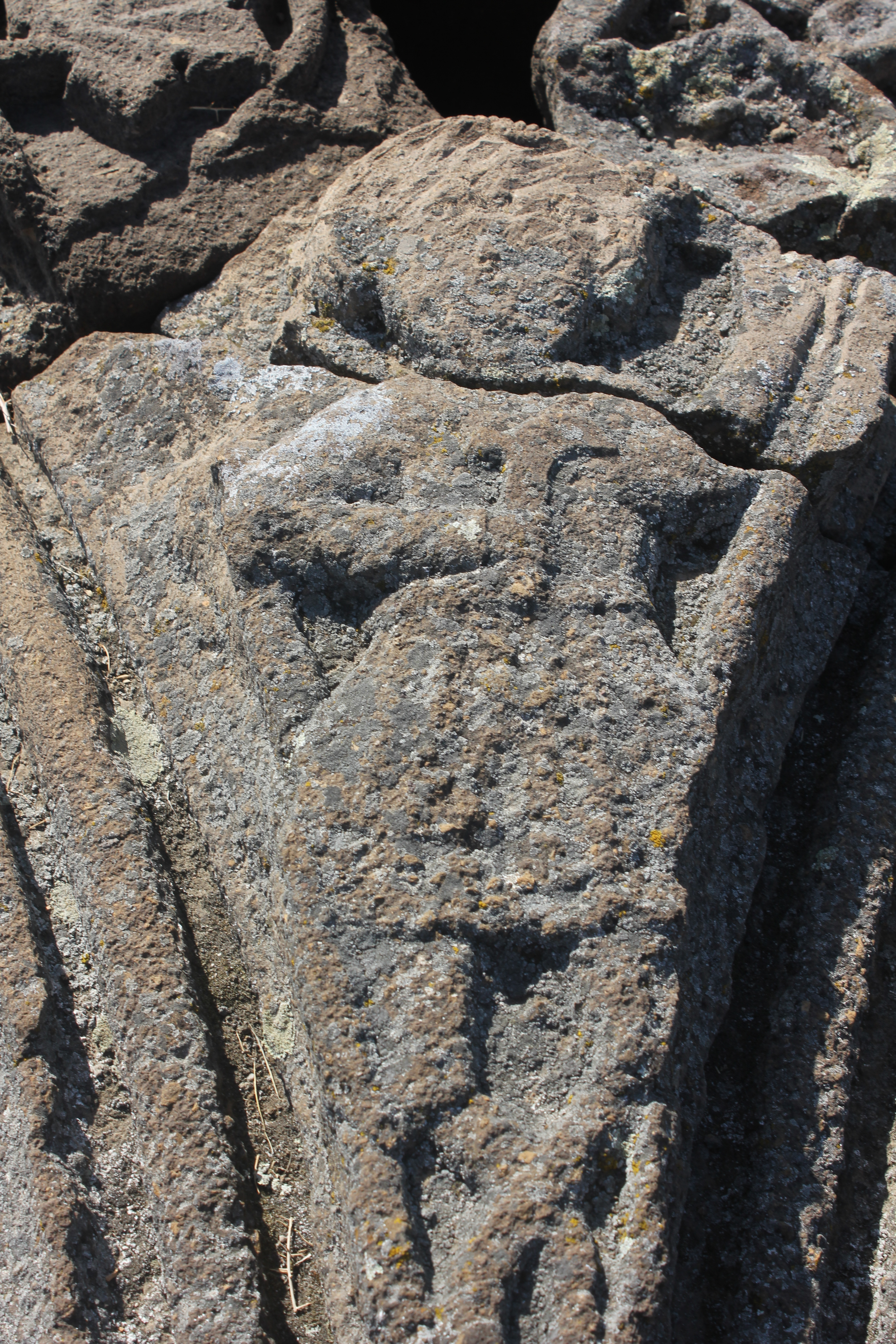
Apostle of the Church, also known as the "builder" in Zvartnots, 652

The Armenian basilicas of the early period (5th–6th centuries) were characterized by symbolic images: crosses with the arms of equal length in a circle, complemented by floral and geometrical motifs symbolizing eternal life. Crosses were often raised on a short pole or stepped base as the symbol of Golgotha.

It is noteworthy that in the South Caucasus, only in Armenia, one can find monogram crosses (crus monogramatica) with the combination of two stylized letters of the name of Christ (Aghtsk, Kasagh, Etchmiadzin). Such earliest forms of crosses are depicted in the rock cut complex of Vankasar (Artsakh), in the tomb of Aghtsk, as well as on the facades of the basilicas of Lernakert, Tigranakert (Artsakh), Tsitsernavank, Agarak, Yereruyk, Bayburd, and Parpi. Also typical of this period are depictions of vine scrolls, palmettes, acanthus, and lily flowers, as well as depictions of birds, sometimes animals’ combat as symbols of the triumph of faith and the eternal struggle.

Plot scenes are almost absent in the mentioned period. Some notable exceptions are the images of the apostle Paul and Saint Thecla on the cathedral of Etchmiadzin, as well as the scenes of Daniel in the Lions’ Den and hunting of a boar on the Arshakuni tomb in Aghtsk (5th century).

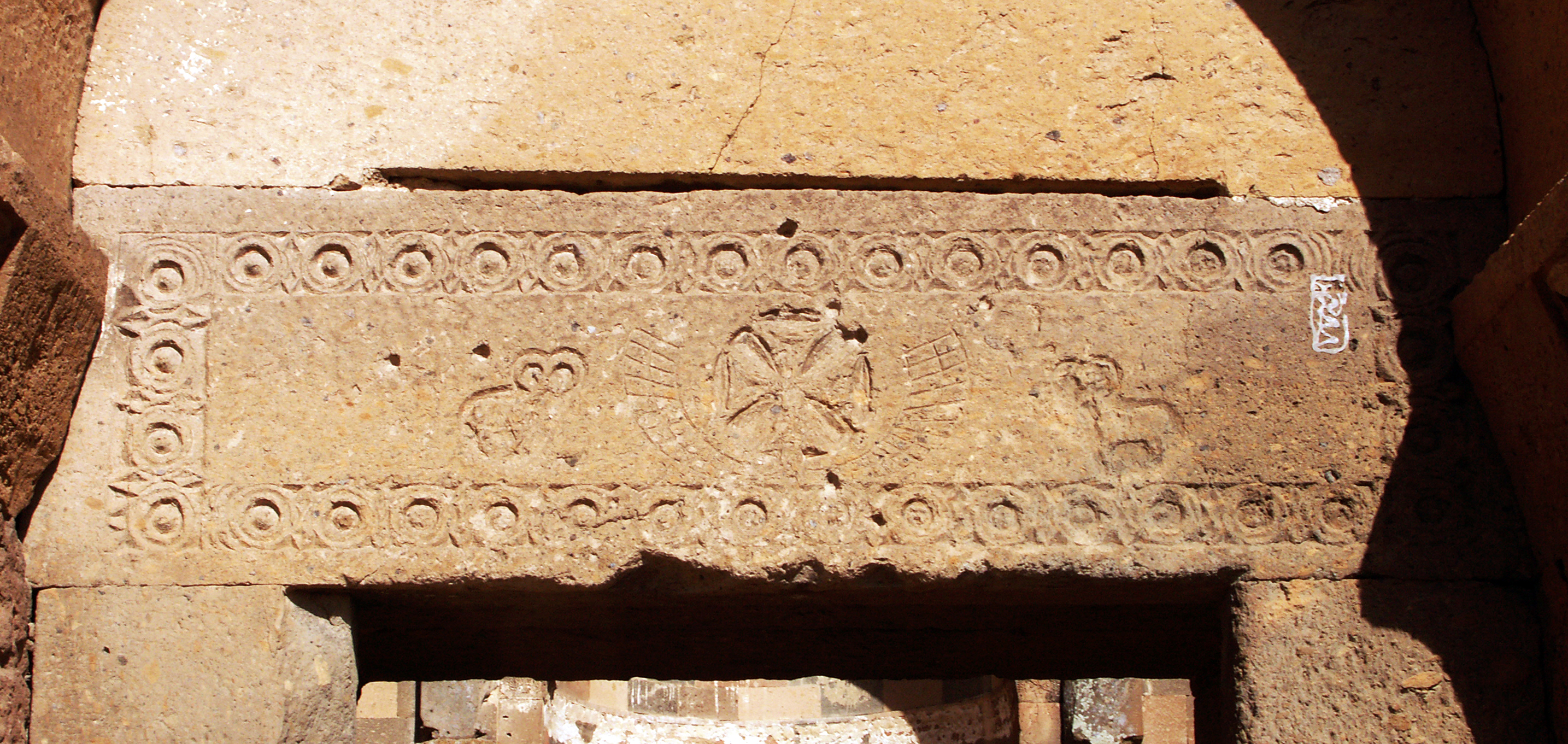
"Greek Cross" with ribbons and rams (Basilica of Ereruyk, 6th century)

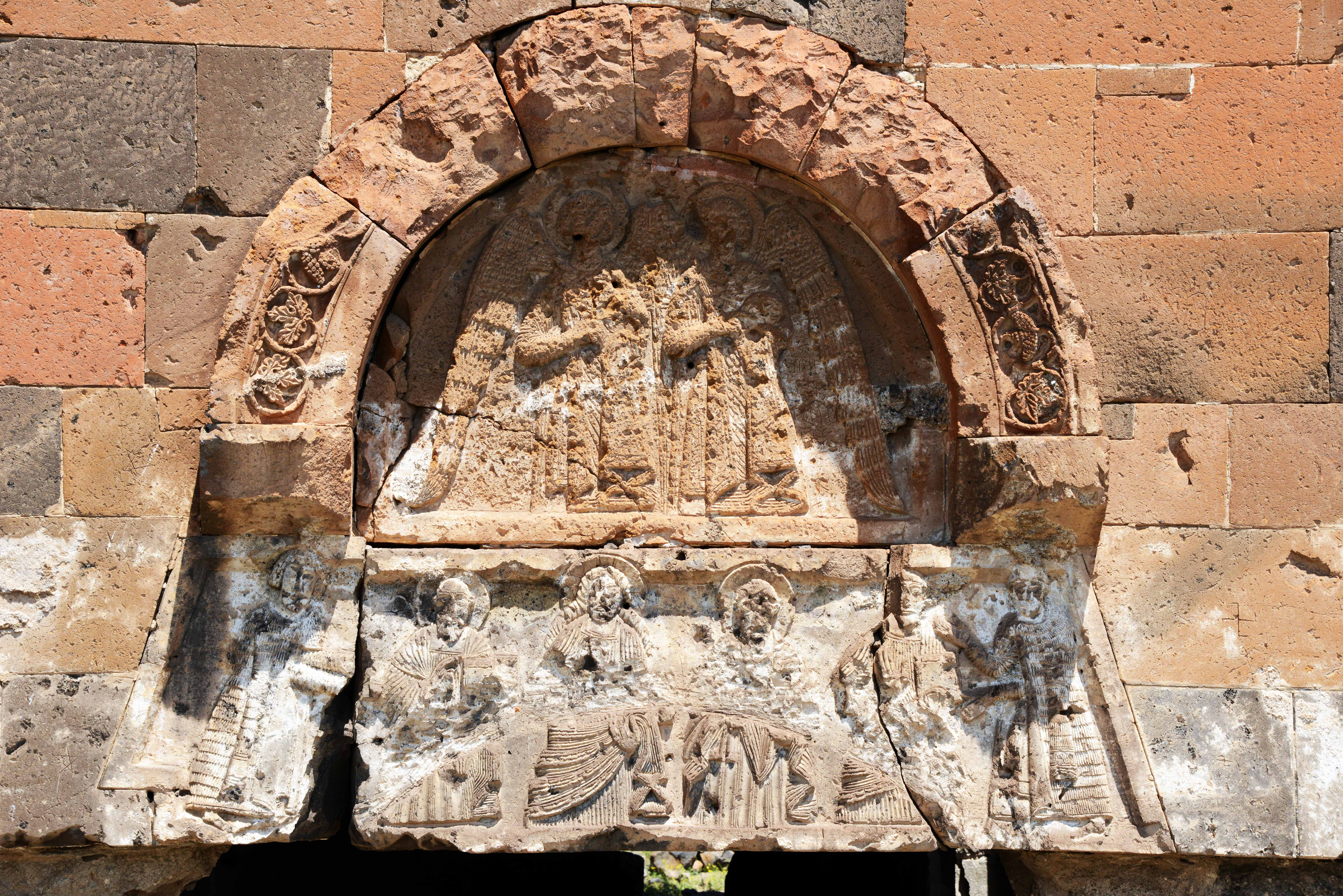
Scene depicting apostles, patrons, princes, and a bishop (Mren Church, 639)

The first high point of the development of Armenian medieval sculpture is the 7th century, and it coincides with the "golden age" of Armenian architecture. In this period, new compositions appeared, and various artistic and iconographic solutions were developed. Holy and patron imagery (Mren, Pemzashen, Ptghni) became almost mandatory. Various forms of crosses became popular: Latin crosses, lobed, braided crosses, and crosses imitating a coating with gems/jewels. Geometric and vegetal elements (cornices, archivolts of windows) fascinated with their variety of classical ornaments. Images of animals and birds with symbolic meaning had an important place in the sculpture: deer, bull, ram, bear, goat, pigeon, peacock, eagle (Barekamavan, Tsob, Tspni, Tallinn, Agarak, Tsiranovor, Zvartnots, etc.).

Sacred images and Christian themes became widely used: Christ (Mren, Odzun), Virgin Mary with the Child (Dvin, Odzun, Pemzashen), the apostles (Etchmiadzin), Saints, including the Holy Soldiers (Dvin, Odzun), as well as the Ascension (Odzun, Ptghnavank), the Annunciation (Odzun). There are more images and scenes on the four-sided stelae that often remind icon compositions․ The most important achievement of the 7th century is the harmonious combination of church building and sculptural decoration, which is expressed in Zvartnots (652). Here, the blind arcades wrap all three tiers of the church, and this composition has direct correlation both to the architecture of the Anastasis Rotunda in Jerusalem (327 AD) and a symbolic image of Jerusalem.

In Zvartnots, the Heavenly Garden is presented for the first time, with alternating images of vine scrolls and pomegranate trees, against which human figures and animal(s), such as a bear, appear. The blind arcade and the Heavenly Garden, generally ascending to the late antique and early Christian art, thanks to Zvartnots, once and for all entered and became a source of inspiration for the Armenian church buildings of the later centuries. Referring to the monuments of the early period, the Armenian architect Toros Toramanyan especially mentions the living spirit of antiquity.

Varieties of blind arcades were popular in the Bagratid and Zakarid times. And the Heavenly Garden of Zvartnots receives a different interpretation in the Talin Cathedral (2nd half of the 7th century), in the Holy Cross Church of Aghtamar (915–921), as well as in the churches of Ani in the first half of the 13th century. The Armenian "golden age" is interrupted by Arab invasions.

== Early medieval period (9th–11th centuries) ==
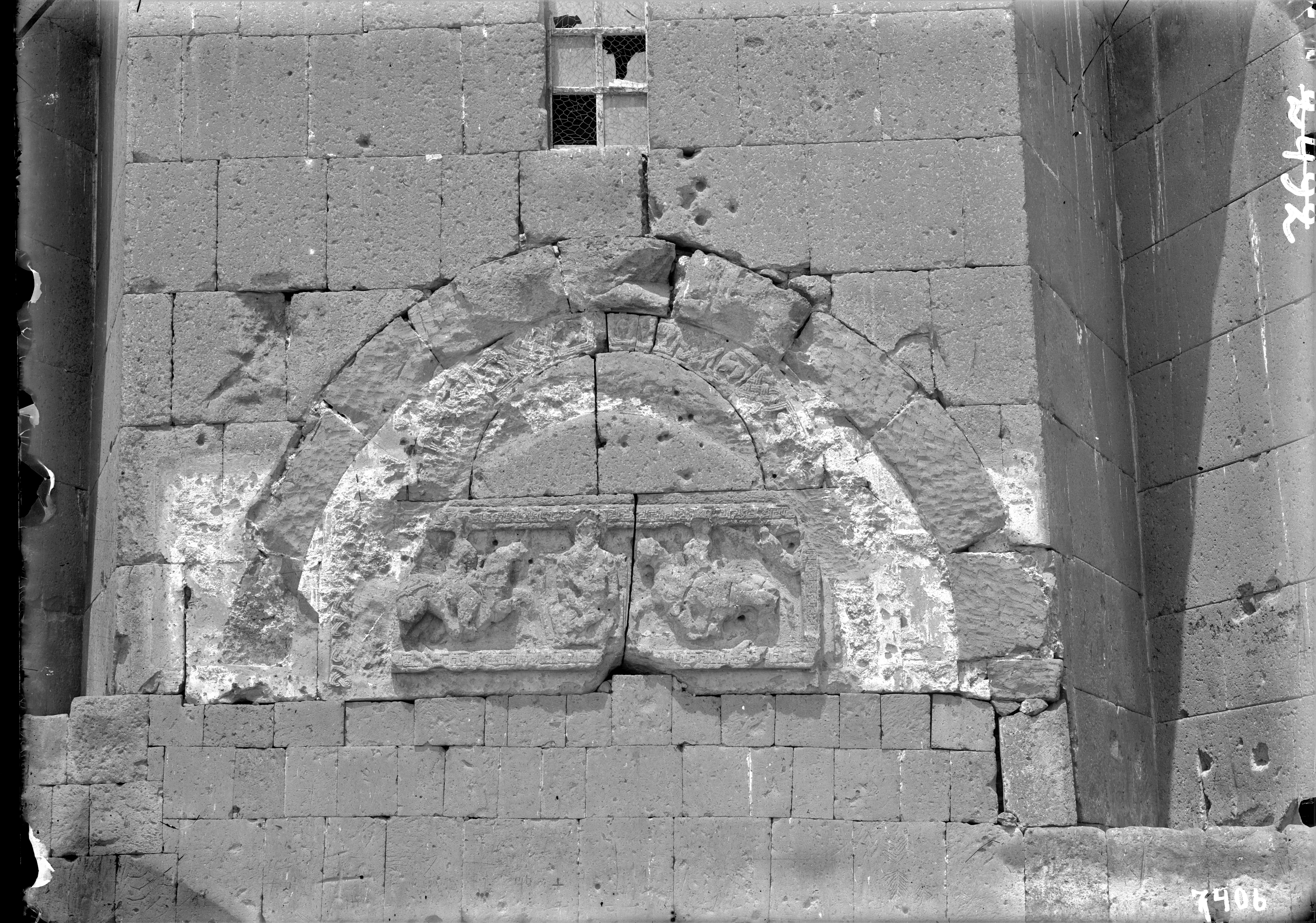
Cavaliers before the Mother of God, Erznka (Oguzlu), near Ani, Western Armenia, nowadays Turkey (destroyed), 895

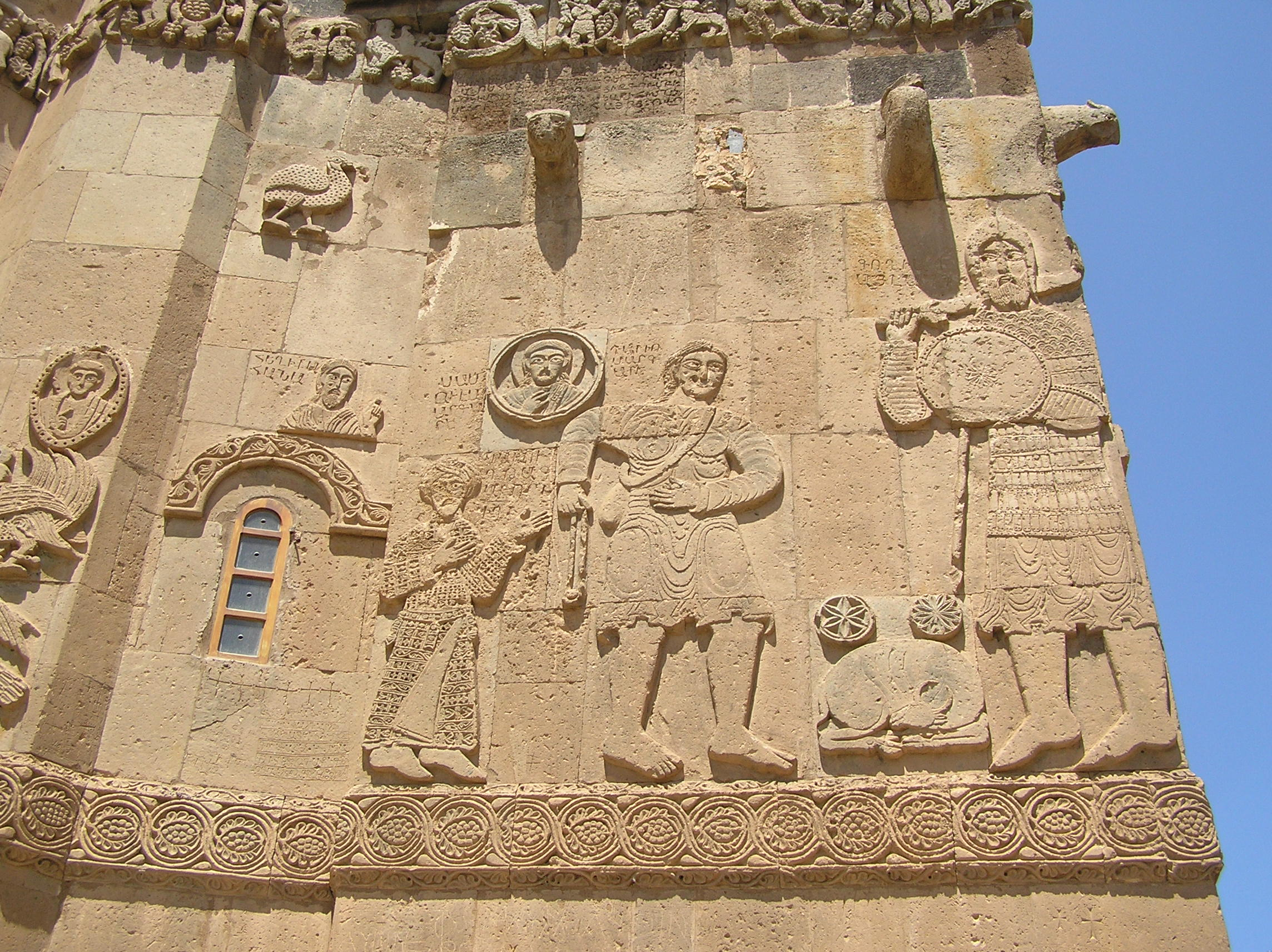
A detail of David and Goliath in Aghtamar Cathedral, 916-921

After the period of Arab rule in Armenia and the South Caucasus, a new period of cultural flourishing began, and active church building was accompanied by new sculptural compositions and solutions. The "first signs" were khachkars (cross stones), which partially continued the tradition of four-sided stelae, forming an original compositional and iconographic system.

The period of great and small kingdoms in Armenia, the 9th–11th centuries, was characterized by the formation of several large cultural centers and artistic styles: in Shirak (Shirakavan, Argina, Kars, Ani), Tayk (Ishkhan, Banak, Chordvan, Khakhu), Vaspurakan (Aghtamar), and Syunik (Tatev, Bgheno-Noravank).

In 915–921, by the order of Gagik Artsruni, the Armenian king of Vaspurakan, one of the unique Armenian monuments, the Church of the Holy Cross on the Aghtamar island was built. The peculiarity of the building was the modest size of the church, the facades of which the architect Manuel managed to decorate with an unprecedented number of sculptures and extensive scenes. The animal types in reliefs are also unprecedented, including fabulous ones. Alternating with each other, uninterrupted rows of scenes and images of the Aghtamar church seem to be depictions of scenes from the Bible. The monumental images of King Gagik and the deified ancestors of the Artsruni family also found their place in this "Heavenly World".

The 9th–11th century Armenian sculpture is rich in images of patrons. On the tympanum of the main entrance of the church of Yerznka (near Ani) (895) were depicted two princes on horseback before the Virgin and Child and accompanied by angels (destroyed). In the second half of the 10th century, the high relief figures of the crowned princes Gurgen and Smbat Bagratuni were depicted on the eastern facades of the main churches of Sanahin and Haghpat monasteries (St. Amenaprkich church 966, St. Nshan church 976).

And the representatives of the younger branch of Bagratuni (in Tayk), Bagrat and David, were solemnly depicted in Oshkvank (963–973). The compositions of Aghtamar and Oshkvank had direct iconographic correlation to Byzantine imperial images (the mosaic of Constantine and Justinian, St. Sophia, end of the 10th century). And the almost round sculpture of Smbat Bagratuni in Haghpat got its further development in the two-meter statue of King Gagik of Ani, which once decorated the façade of the church of St. Grigor-Gagkashen (1001–1020, architect Trdat).

A group of frontal sculptural faces has pre-existing unique decorations. That composition consisted of blind arcades extending along the facades of the church and a sculptured "belt" of the Heavenly Garden inhabited by birds, animals, and sometimes with human figures.

== Zakarian period (12th–13th centuries) ==
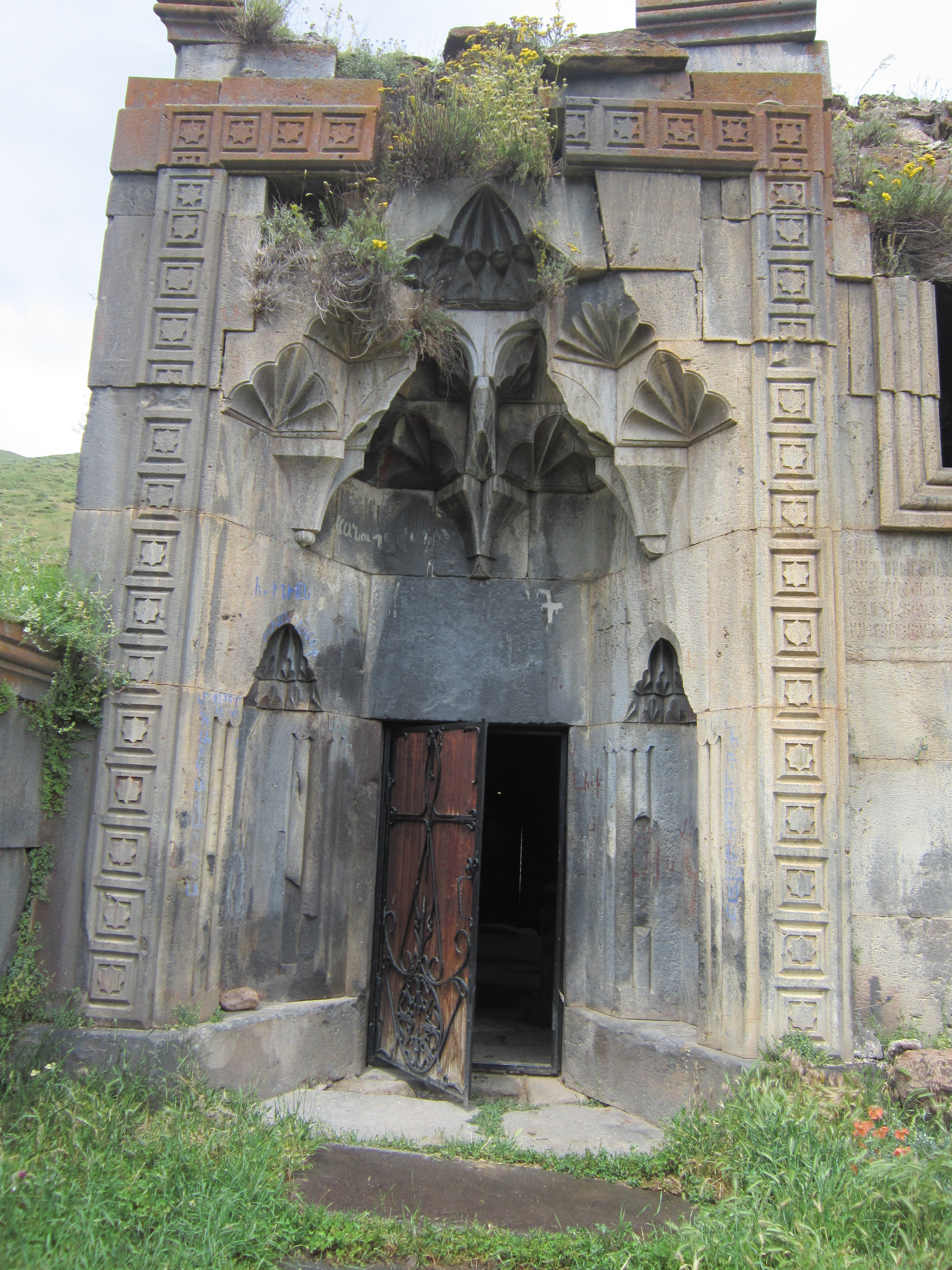
Muqarnas portal structure in Neghuts Monastery, 13th century

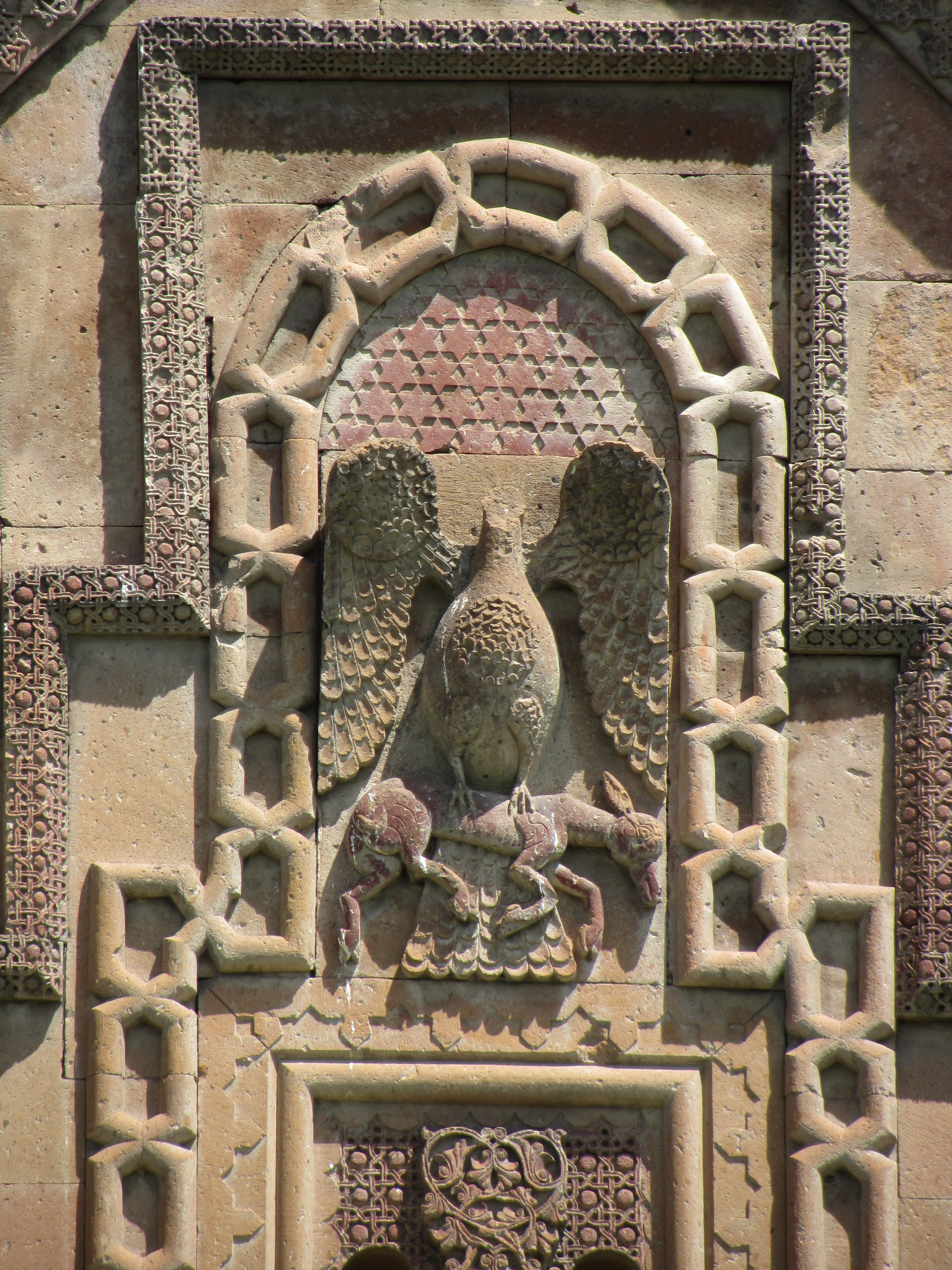
"Eagle an animal in its claws" and the façade decoration, Holy Mother of God, Eghvard, 1301, southern façade

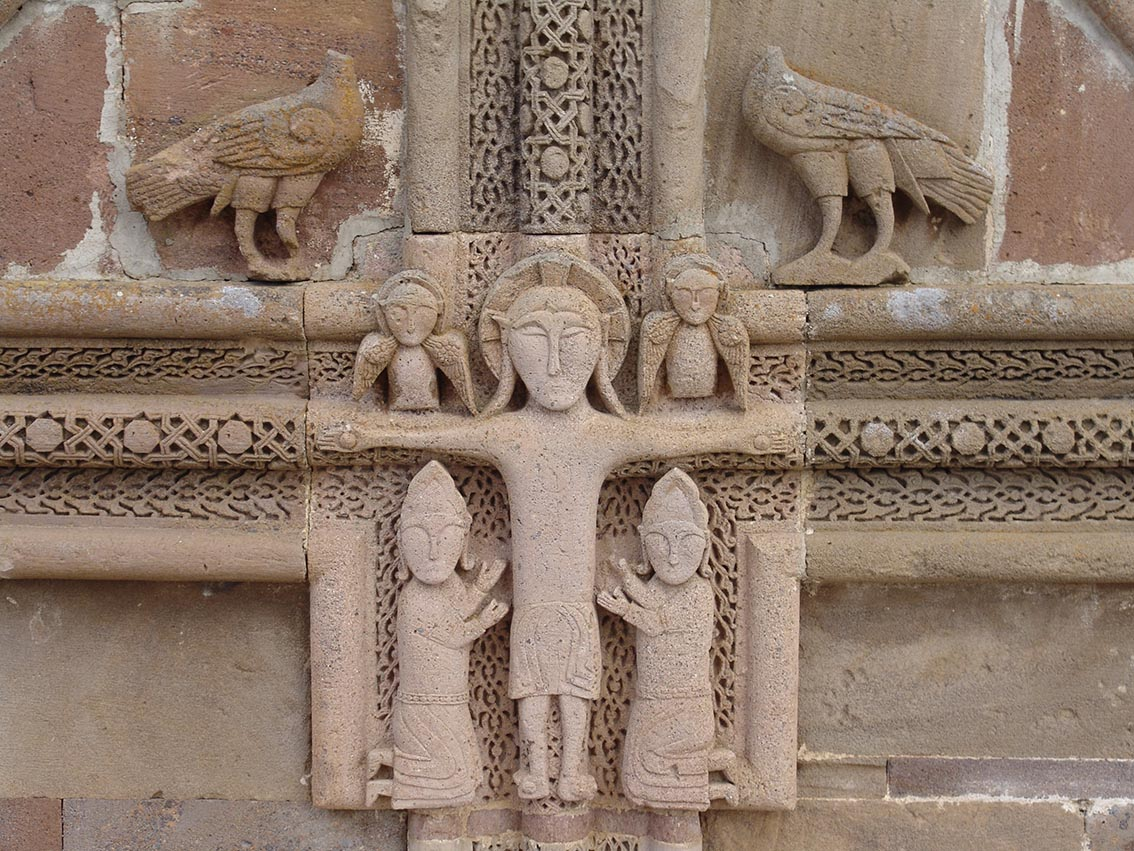
"Khachelutyun"(Crucifixion), Gandzasar Monastery, 1216–1238. west front, photo

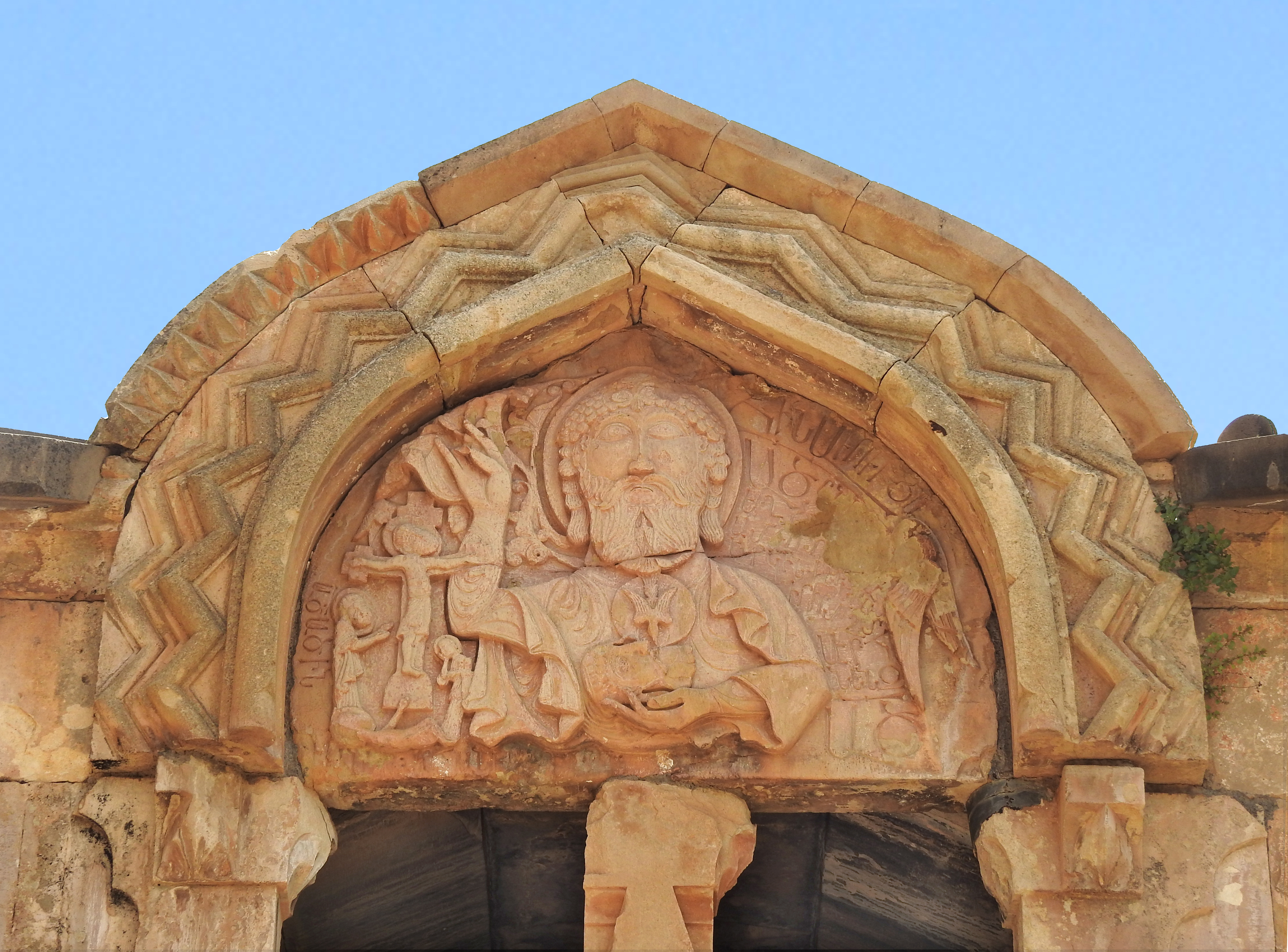
Window tympanum of the Gavit in Noravank. Interpretation is unclear: God the Father with the head of John the Baptist, Jesus or Adam in his hand and Jesus on the Cross

The very composition iconographically goes back to the Zvartnots decoration and became one of the artistic styles of Ani during the Zakaryan time, named as "picturesque" style. In the same period, there was also a unique style of decoration of the eastern facades with a combination of a large cross, a decorative window frame, and geometric rosettes (Hovhannavank, Akhtala, Kobayr).

Perhaps one of the most characteristic decoration techniques of the time was stalactite vaulting (muqarnas), which was widely used both in small decoration elements (cornice, entrances, and window frames) and in monumental compositions (skylight of the gavits, staircases, and corner sections of the walls), forming an illusion of a constructive element. Perhaps the most impressive is the design of the portals (Neghuts monastery, the gavit of the Church of the Holy Apostoles of Ani.

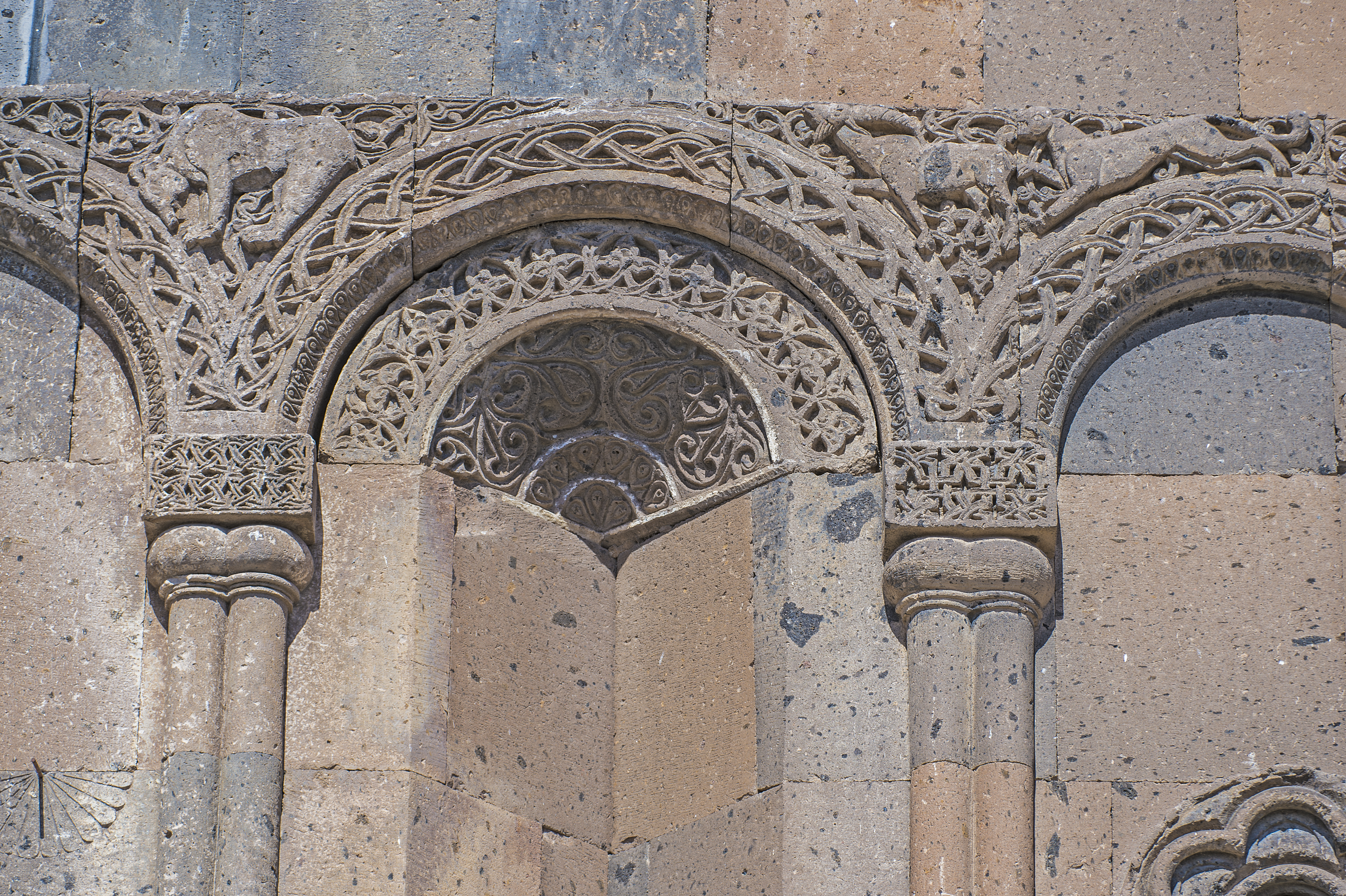
Exterior of Tigran Honents Church, 13th century

In this period, great attention was paid to the design of the altar elevations, which were decorated with blind arcades (Goshavank, Tsaghats kar), sculpted rhombuses or rosettes (Harich, Gandzasar, Makaravank, Marmashen), net-like ornaments, stars or polygons (Ushi, Astsvatsnkal, Aghjots Vank, Vanstan, Gtchavank). In this series, exceptional is the alter elevation of the church in Tegenyats monastery with a combination of geometric, floral, and bird images, which has compositional commonality with early Christian chancel-barriers. All ornaments were made with the "needlework" style of carving, and the polychromy, the combination of multi-colored stones, is often used. The entrances are also decorated with this same principle and artistic style, with the combination of multi-colored stars, quatrefoils, and polyhedra attached to each other (Nor Varagavank, Deghdznut, Harich).

The 13–14th-century church tympanums and sometimes even the church facades stand out with their monumental sculpture and volumetric compositions on biblical themes. Among them are the images of Christ with the apostles Paul and Peter (Noravank), the Second Coming of Christ, the apostles Peter and Paul (Aghjots Vank), the Parable of the Ten Virgins (Hovhannavank), The Virgin with the Child (Amaghu-Noravank, Areni, Spitakavor), as well as the image of Ancient of Days (God the Father) (Noravank).

== Late medieval period (16th–18th centuries) ==
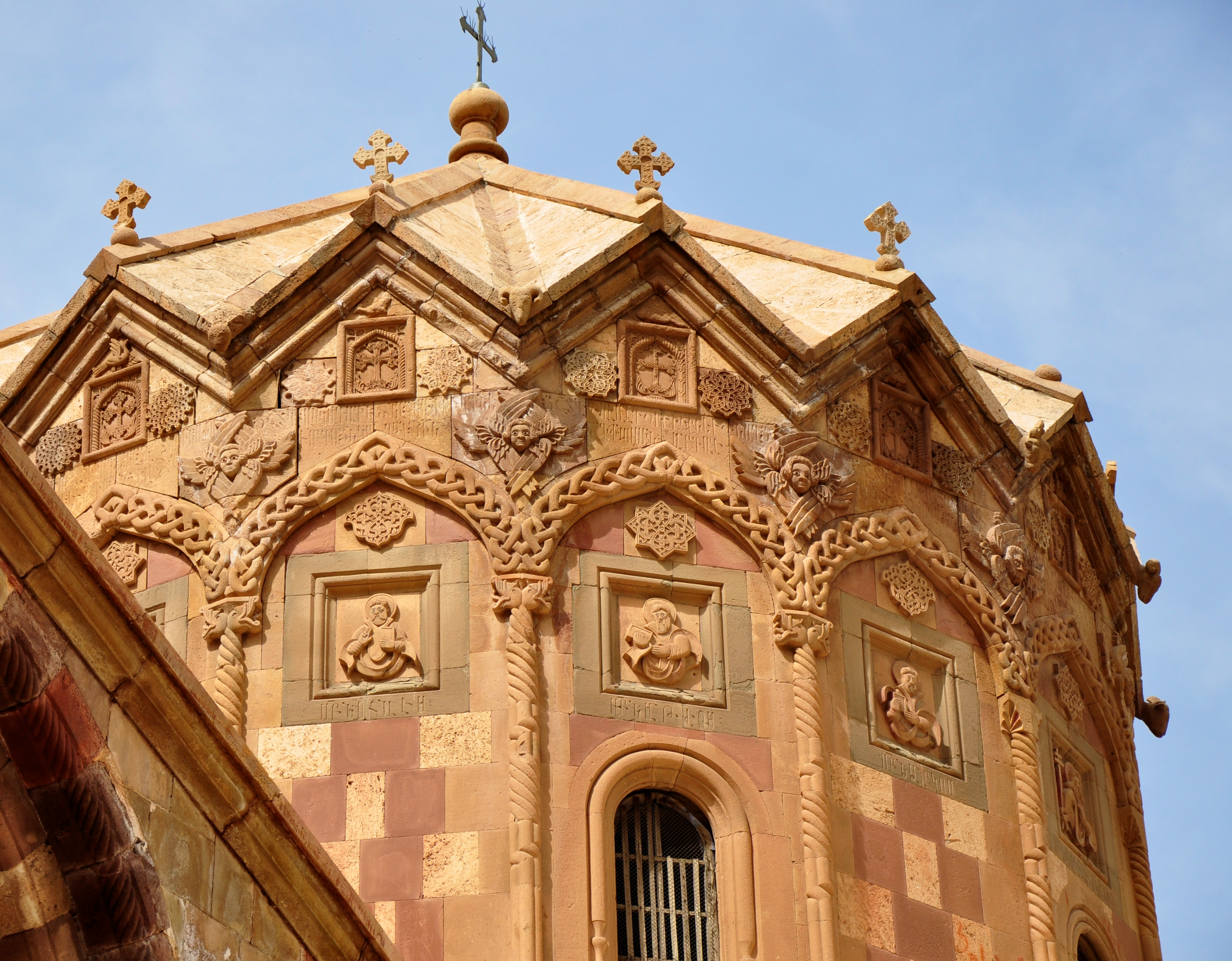
The sculptural decoration of the drum with the portraits of the Apostles, Darashamb Saint Stepanos Monastery, nowadays Republic of Iran, 1643–1655

The late medieval period of Armenian sculpture encompassed the 16th–18th centuries. On the one hand, it was closely connected with medieval art traditions, on the other hand, it communicated with European and Iranian cultures through trade routes. Those influences were more vividly reflected in the monuments created respectively in Iran and in the Armenian colonies of various European countries. It is in that context that the influence of Western iconography is obvious in a number of 17th-century sculptural compositions of churches, such as "The Incredulity of Saint Thomas" (St. Tovma of Agulis), "The Virgin and Child" (St. Christopher of Agulis, St. Astvatsatsin of Tsghna), "The Coronation of the Holy Mother of Christ" (St. Vardan of Astapat), and the Crucifixion of Christ (St. Astvatsatsin of Tsghna).

However, most of the monuments of the time are based on and a continuation of the medieval Armenian art traditions. The bell tower of Etchmiadzin Cathedral, built at that time, has a rich and original sculptural decoration. The reliefs covering the entire surface of this three-story structure consist of ornamental belts, cornices, frames, and semi-columns consisting of floral, crochet, and geometric elements, which are complemented with dimensional images of real and fabulous animals and birds, as well as with figures: Christ Pantocrator, Gregory the Illuminator, Trdat the Great, etc.

For its harmonious and complicated external sculptural decoration stands out the St. Stephen (Stepanos) Church of Darashamb (historical Artaz province, now-Makvi region of the Republic of Iran), in the context of which the traditions and principles of the entire Armenian Middle Ages art are condensed. The western porch of the church is decorated with a magnificent stalactite composition, and the facades are decorated with the compositions of "Crucifixion", "Resurrection", "the Stoning of St. Stephen", "The Virgin and Child", "The Annunciation to the Virgin Mary", and "Nativity and the adoration of the Magi".

The source of inspiration for the design of the church's drum was the drum of the Etchmiadzin Cathedral, with its spiral semi-columns, intertwined pointed arches, and most importantly, with the images of the apostles on the facets of the drum. Presented by the church of St. Stepanos, it is obvious that the hereditary relation of Armenian art to the national traditions and artistic perceptions․
