= Baiburt =

Baiburt may refer to:

- Bayburt, Turkey
- Bayburd, Armenia
