= Holy Mother of God Church, Yeghvard =

Medieval church in Yeghvard, Kotayk Province, Armenia

Holy Mother of God Church
- Սուրբ Աստվածածին եկեղեցի
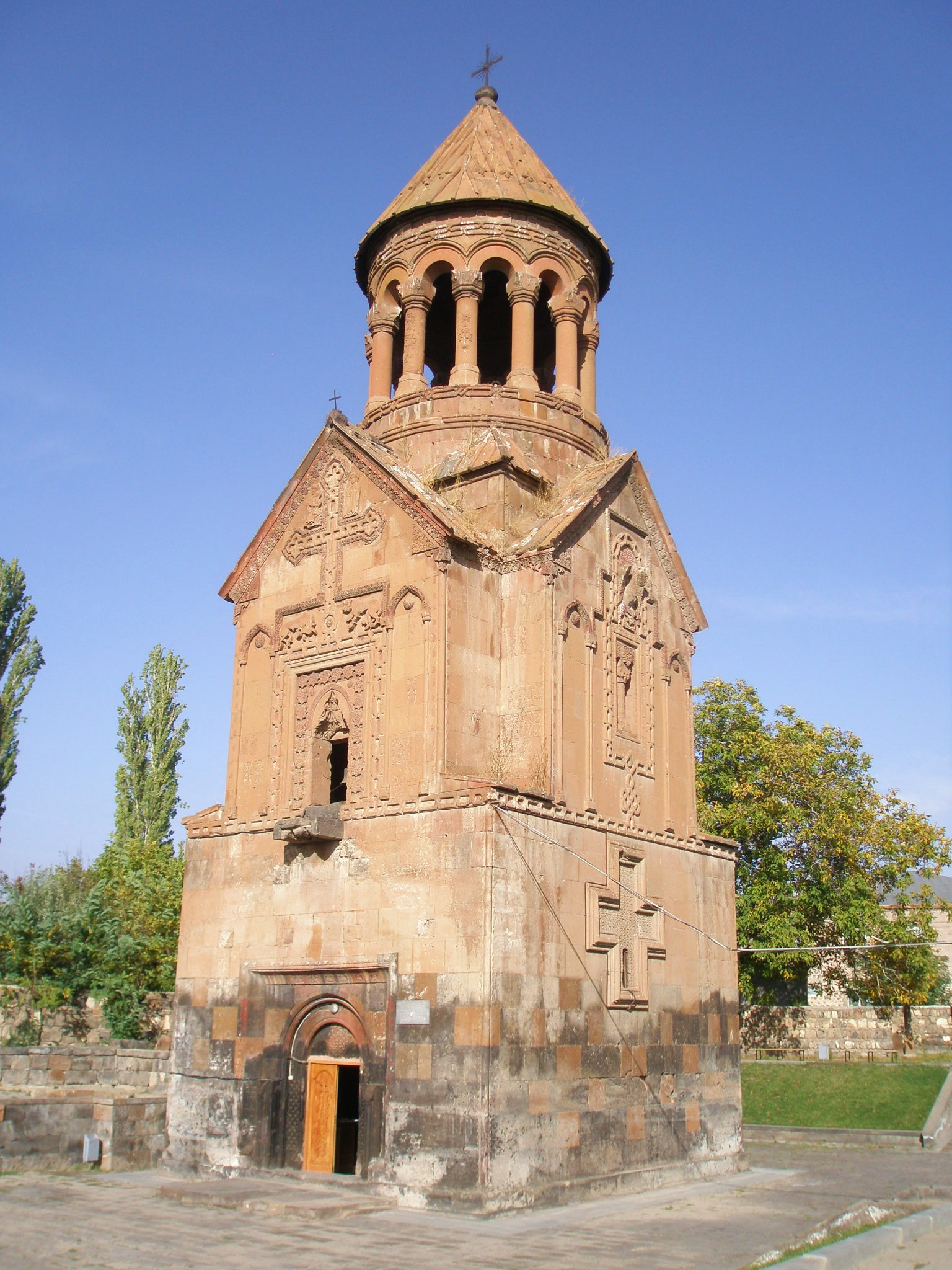
- Holy Mother of God Church in October 2009

- Location within Armenia

Religion
- Affiliation: Armenian Apostolic Church

Location
- Location: Yeghvard, Kotayk Province, Armenia
- Coordinates: 40.3195°N 44.4803°E

Architecture
- Architect: Shahik Vardapet
- Type: Cruciform central-plan inside; rectangular almost square plan outside
- Style: Armenian
- Completed: 1301
- Dome: 1

Holy Mother of God Church (Armenian: Սուրբ Աստվածածին եկեղեցի), sometimes known as Yeghvard Church, is a medieval Armenian church located at the center of Yeghvard in the Kotayk Province of Armenia. It was completed in 1301 during the rule of the Zakarid dynasty by the medieval Armenian architect Vardapet Shahik. The main purpose of the construction was to mark the millennium of the spread of Christianity as the state religion in Armenia. It was built and completed as an alternative church of the nearby ruined Katoghike Church, a large three-nave basilica dating back to the 5th and 6th centuries.

== Architecture ==
The Holy Mother of God Church is a small cruciform central-plan interior with a rectangular but almost square plan exterior and a second floor. Centered above is a single cylindrical drum and a conical umbrella type dome. The drum is made up of twelve columns with arches that support the weight of the dome.

The second floor has a semi-cruciform layout with single small windows to the left and rear façades, while on the right is a larger window with a single column that stands in the middle. A small inset portal sits in the middle of the front façade, with the remnants of exterior stone steps that once led to the second floor.

The first floor has a single large portal at the front façade with a semi-circular lintel and decorative columns, while the left, right, and rear façades each have a small window. The left and right are surrounded by a large intricately carved cross in high-relief.

Exceptionally rich decorations cover a large portion of the church. There are beautiful motifs on each side at the second floor level and geometric patterns around the cornices, eaves, and other parts of the walls. Notable is the large cross carved in high relief on the front flanked by the Virgin Mary holding the baby Jesus and another saint. Below and just above the portal to the second floor are the motifs of a bull and lion. Above the larger window on the right façade is a motif of a large bird with a geometric rosette on its chest holding a hooved animal in its talons. On the left façade is a mountain goat, and on the rear is a large cat pouncing upon a goat.

Adjacent to the church are the remains of a chapel foundation. Khachkars and graves are nearby.

St. Astvatsatsin church of Yeghvard is similar to Noravank built by Momik. In contrast to Noravank, the second floor of St. Astvatsatsin church of Yeghvard was not climbed by stone stairs, but by movable wooden ones.

== Gallery ==
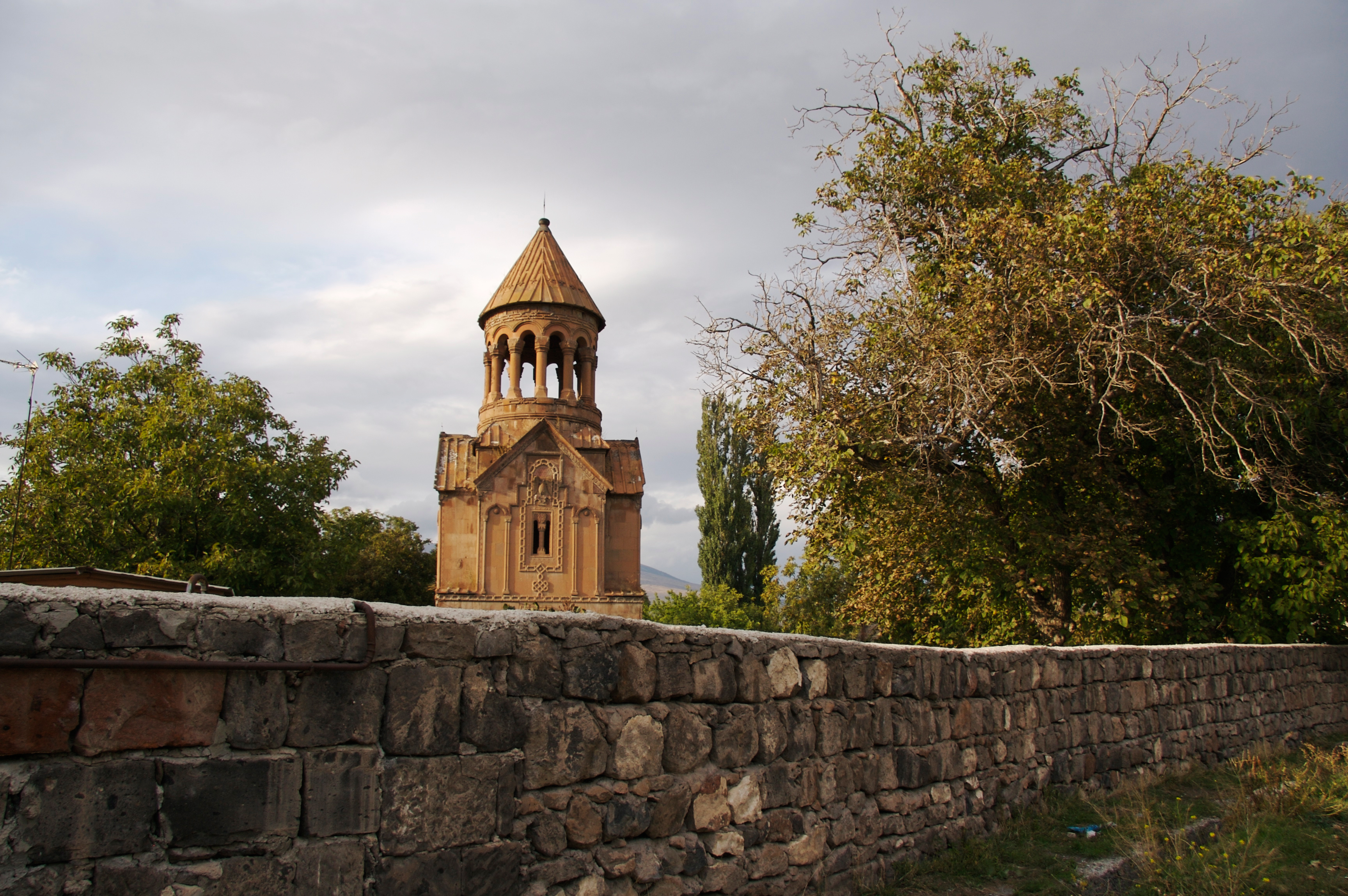
Yeghvard Church View, Yeghvard, Armenia

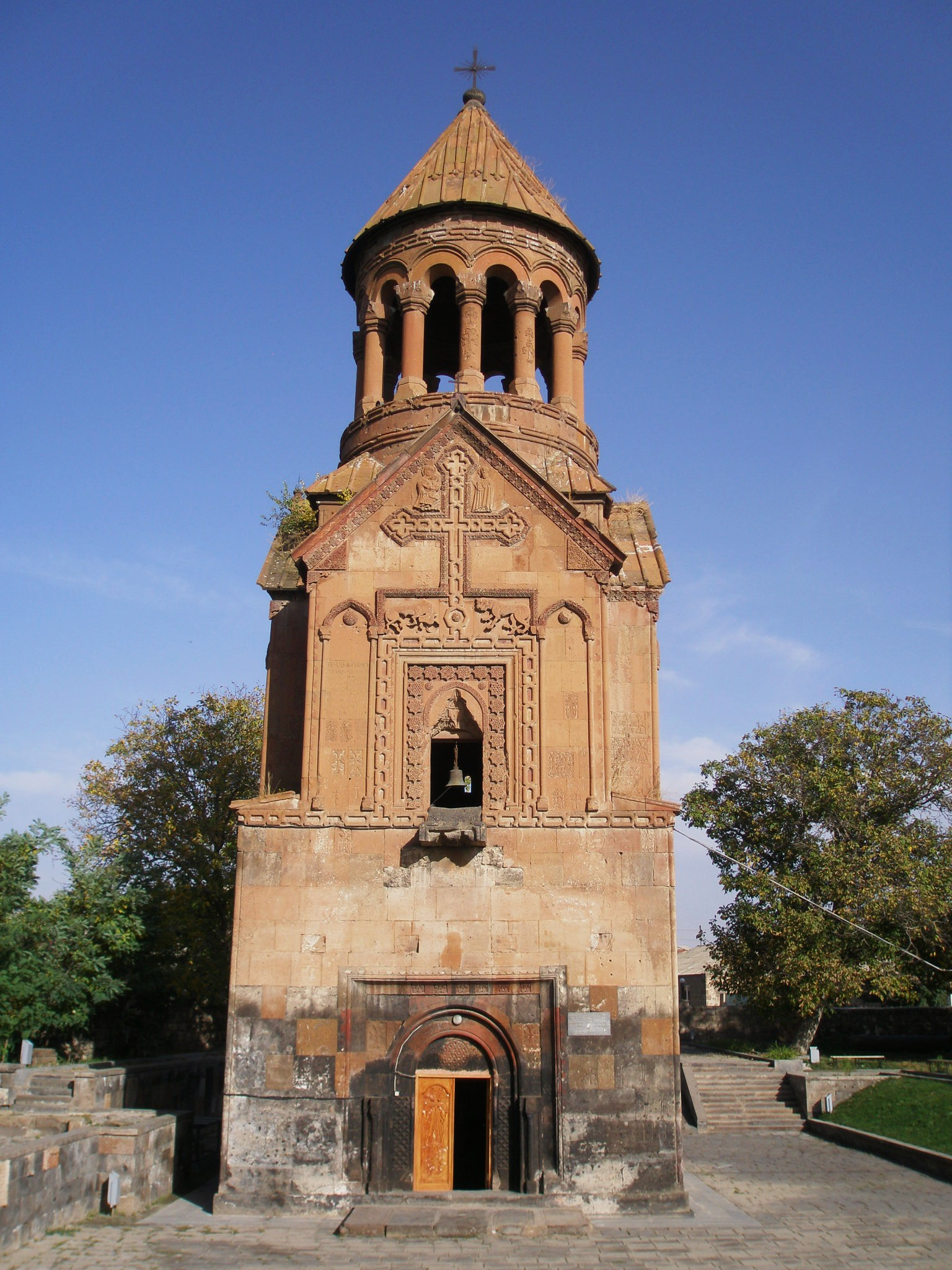
Front façade.

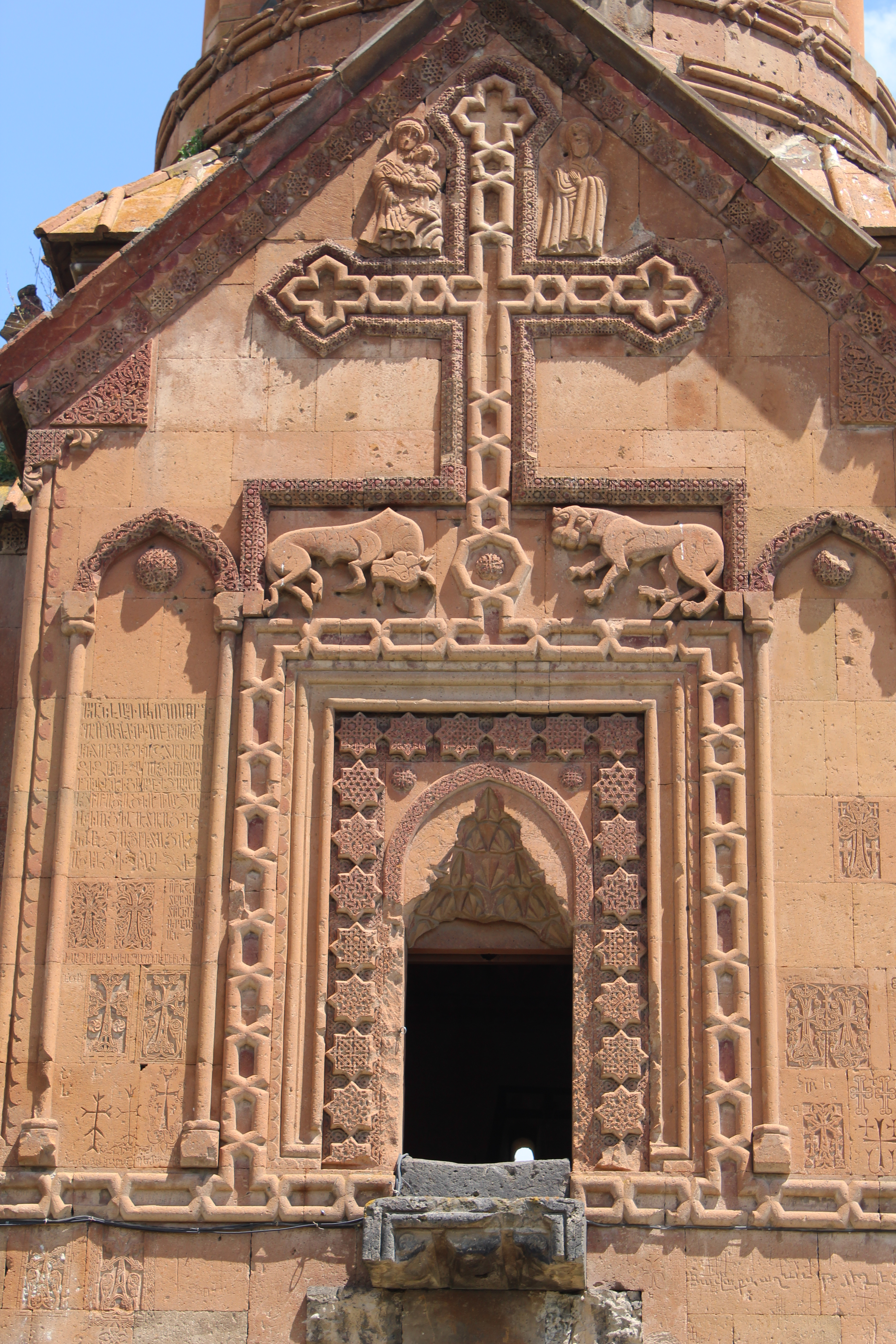

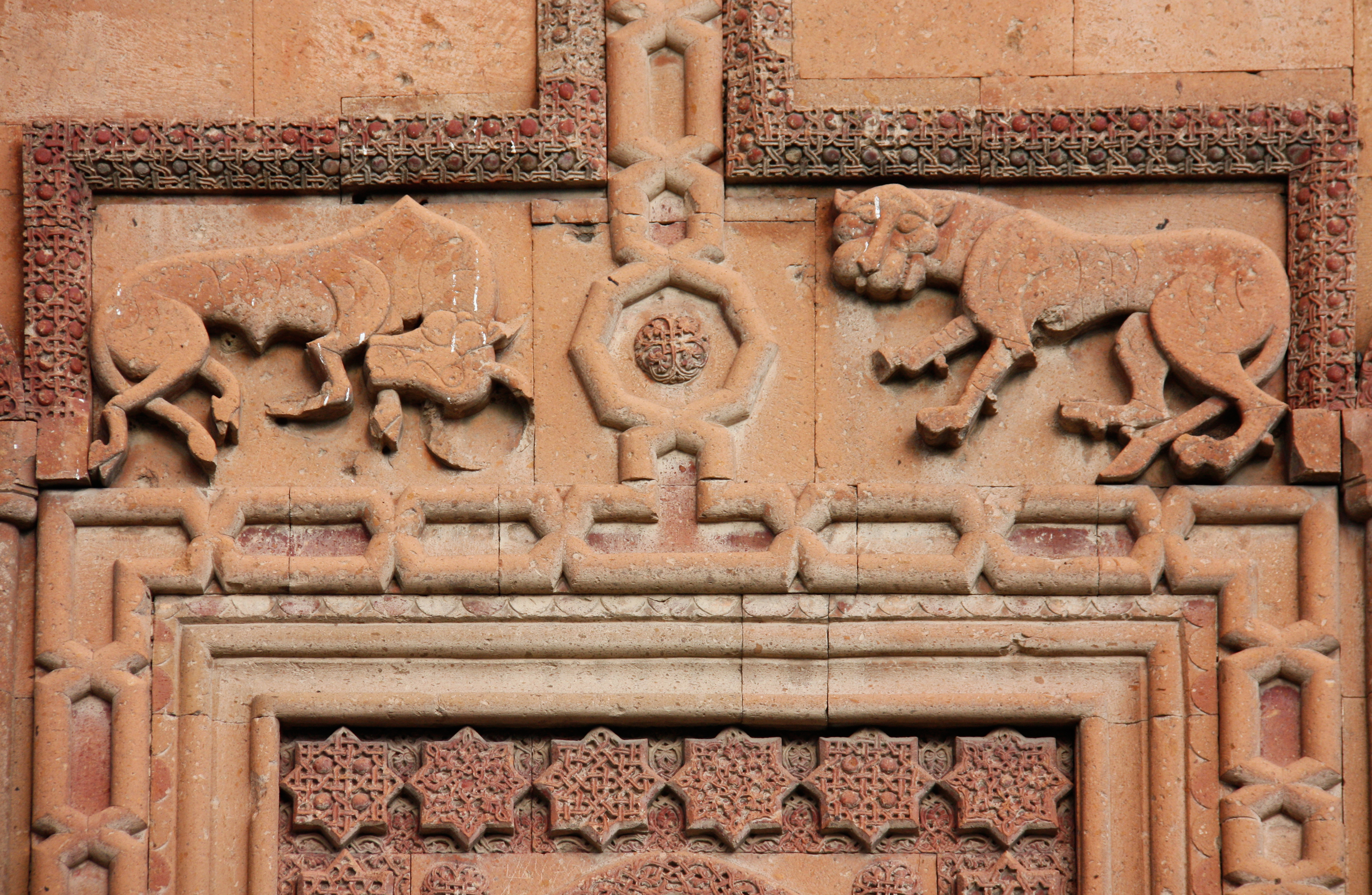
Yeghvard Church, front detail, Armenia

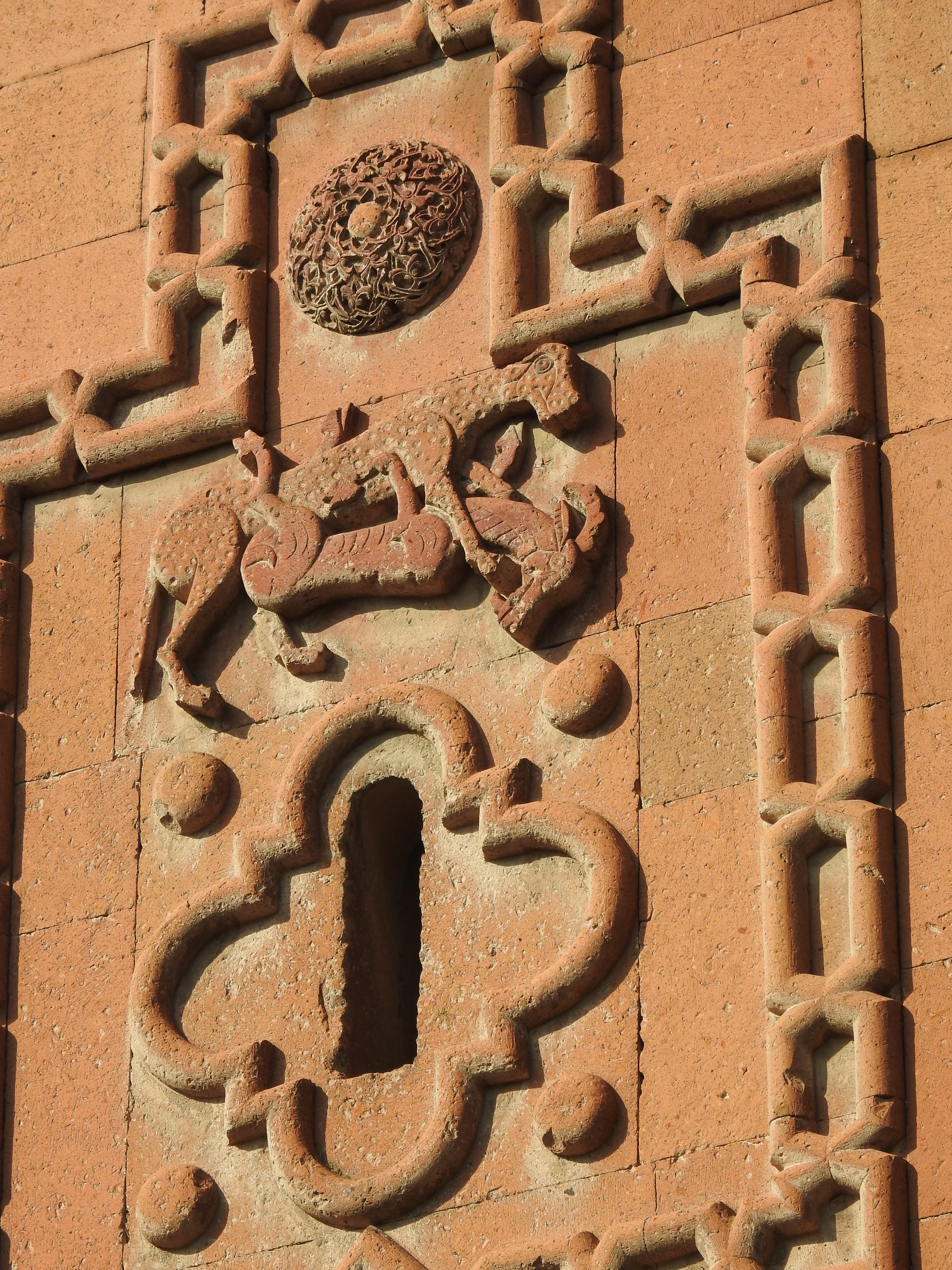

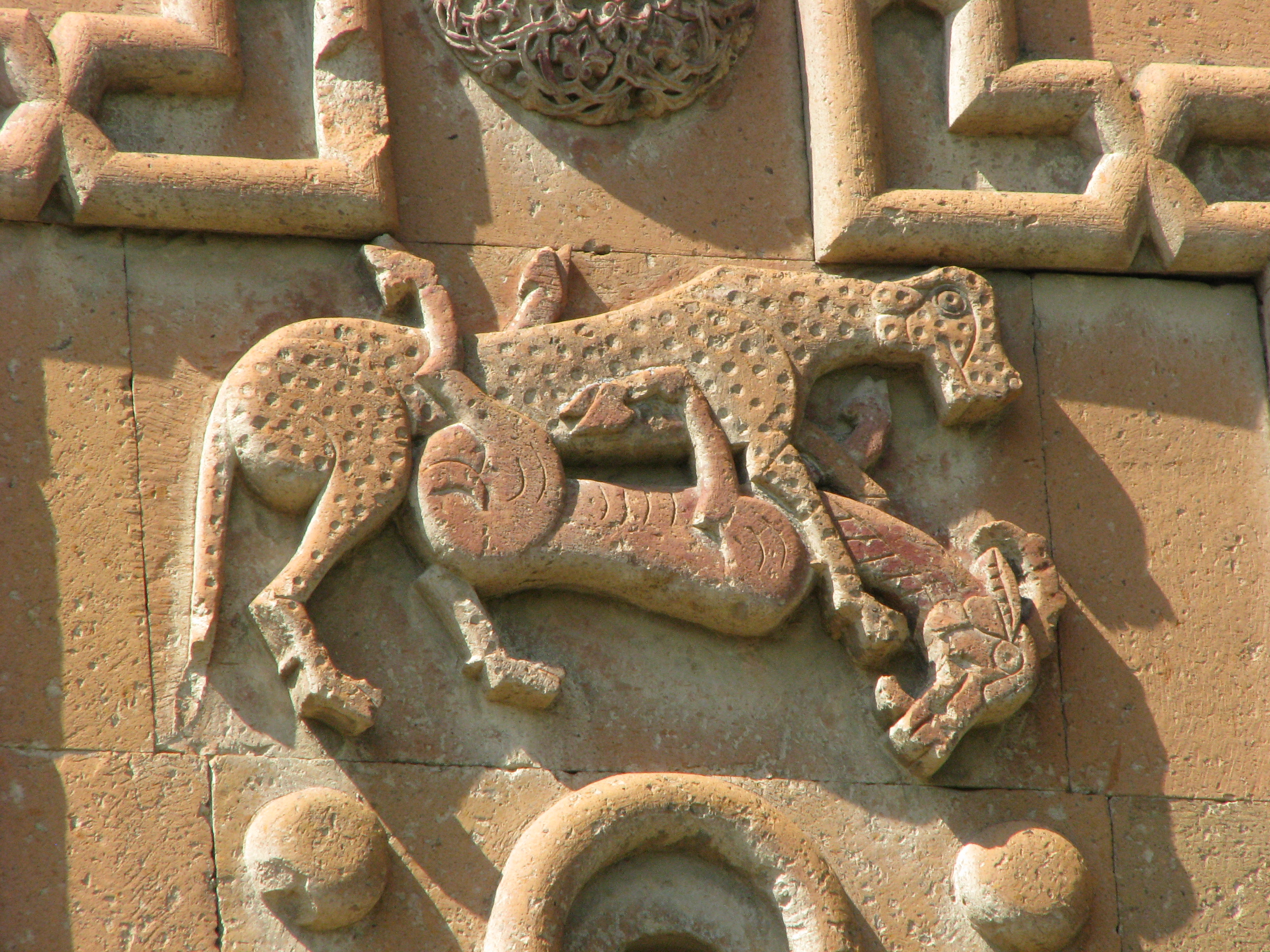

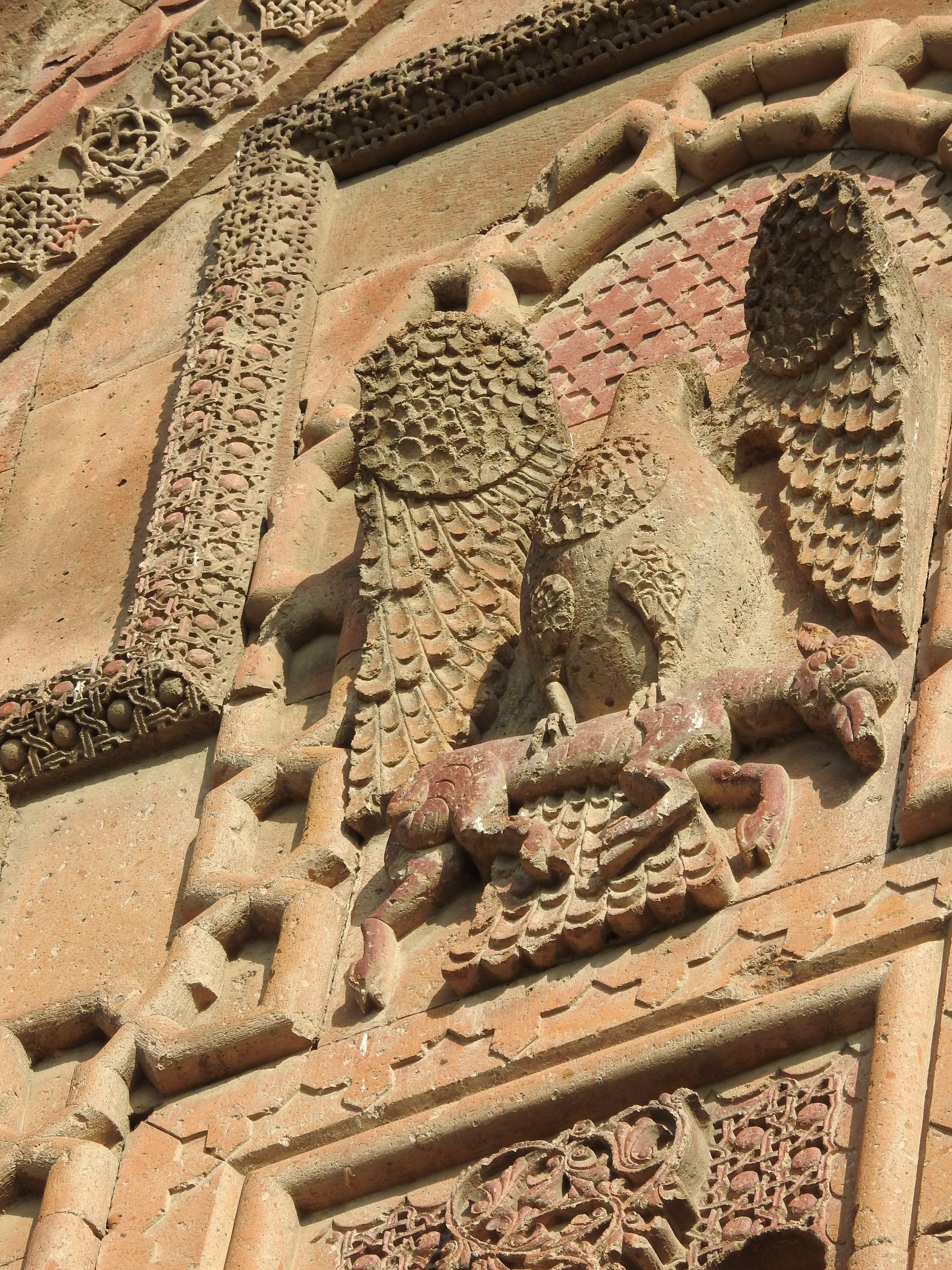

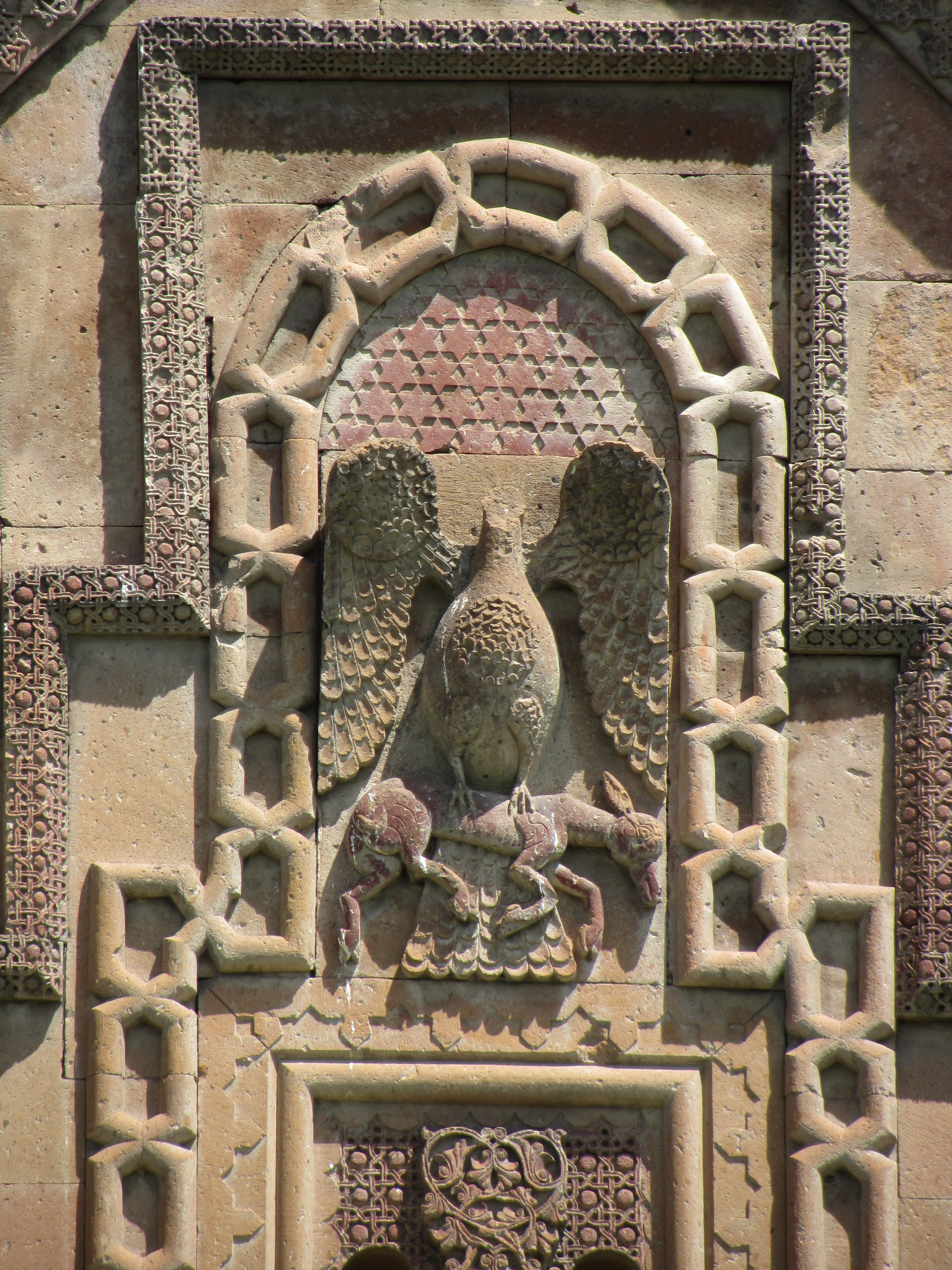

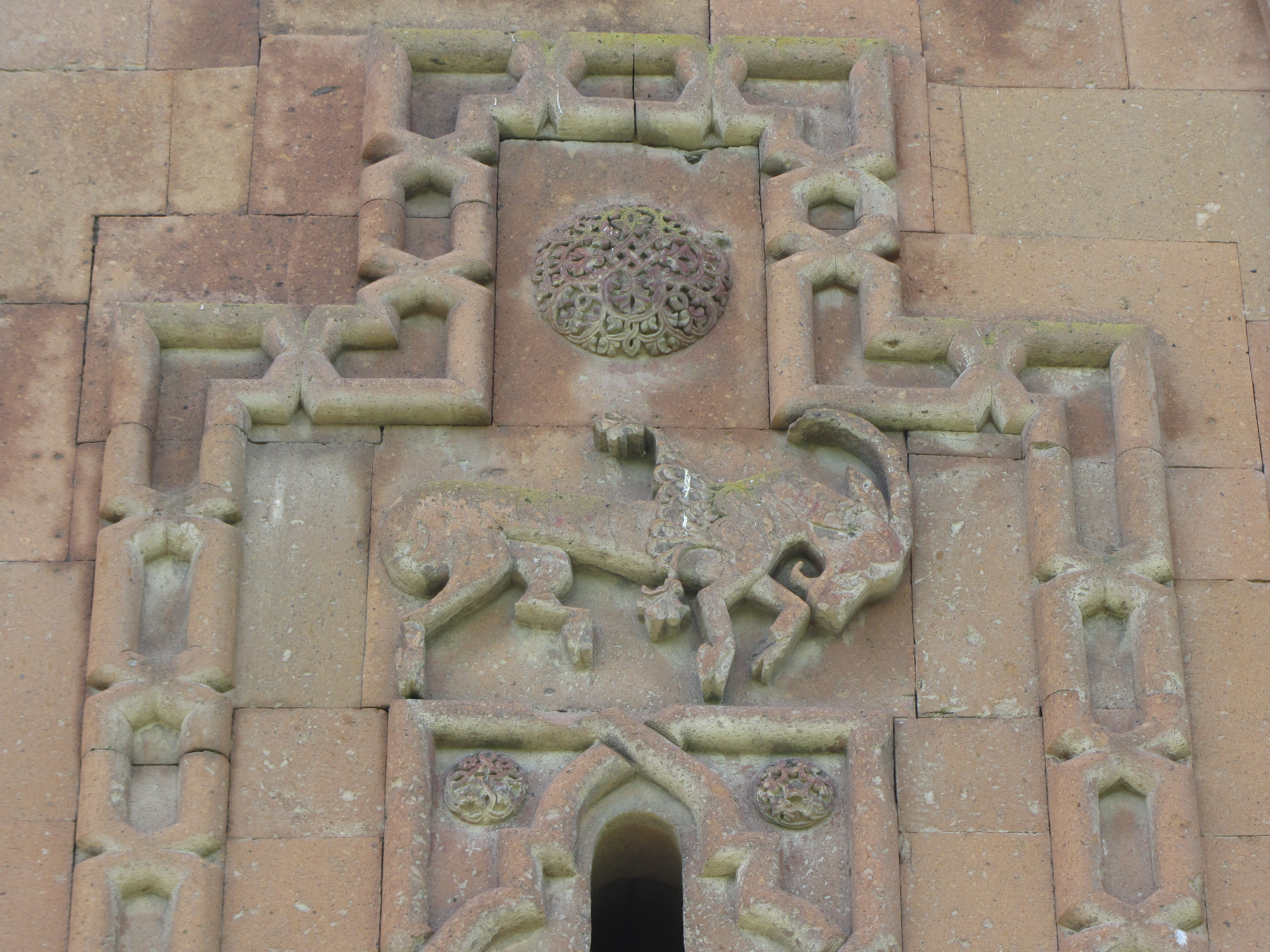

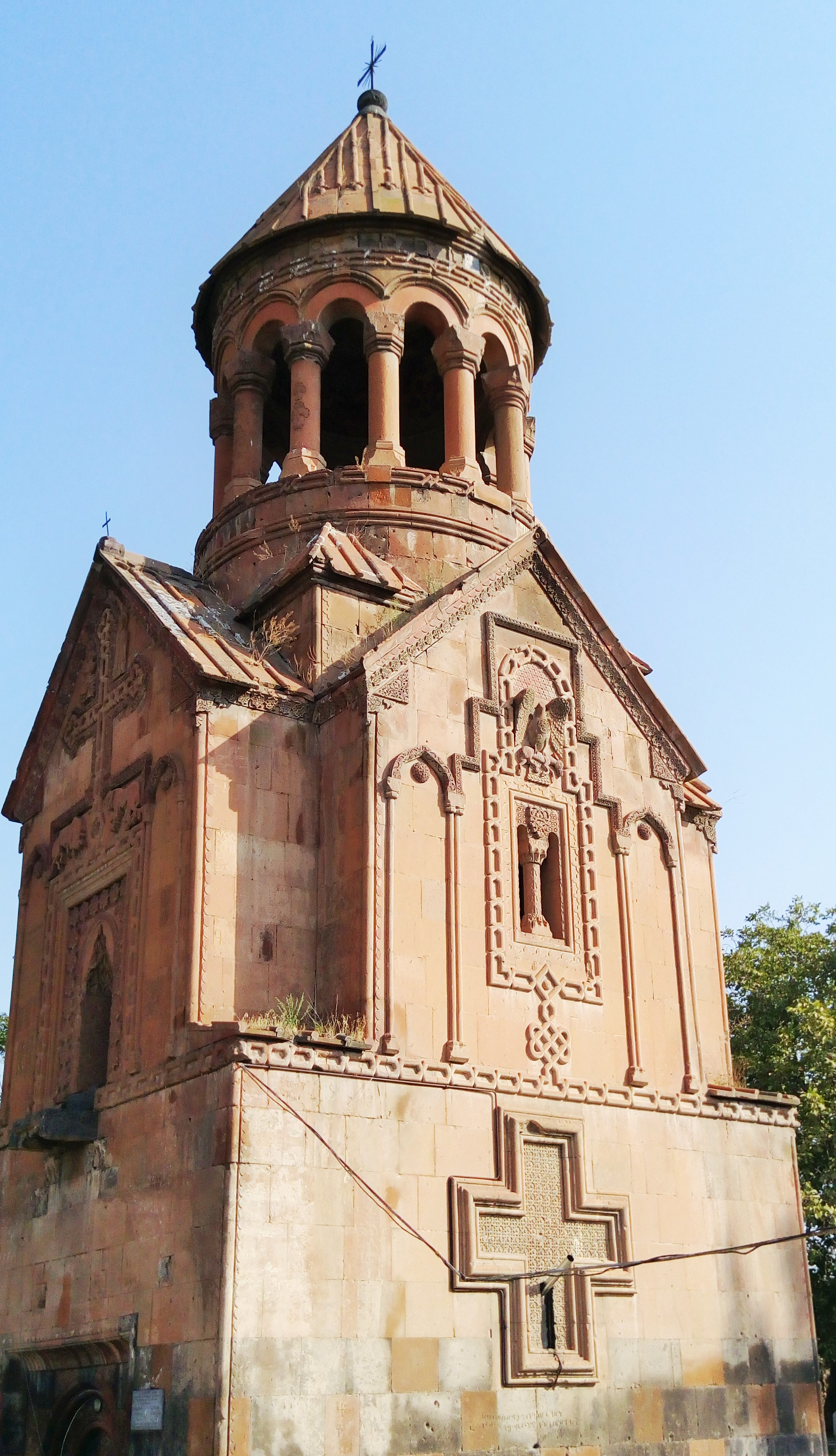

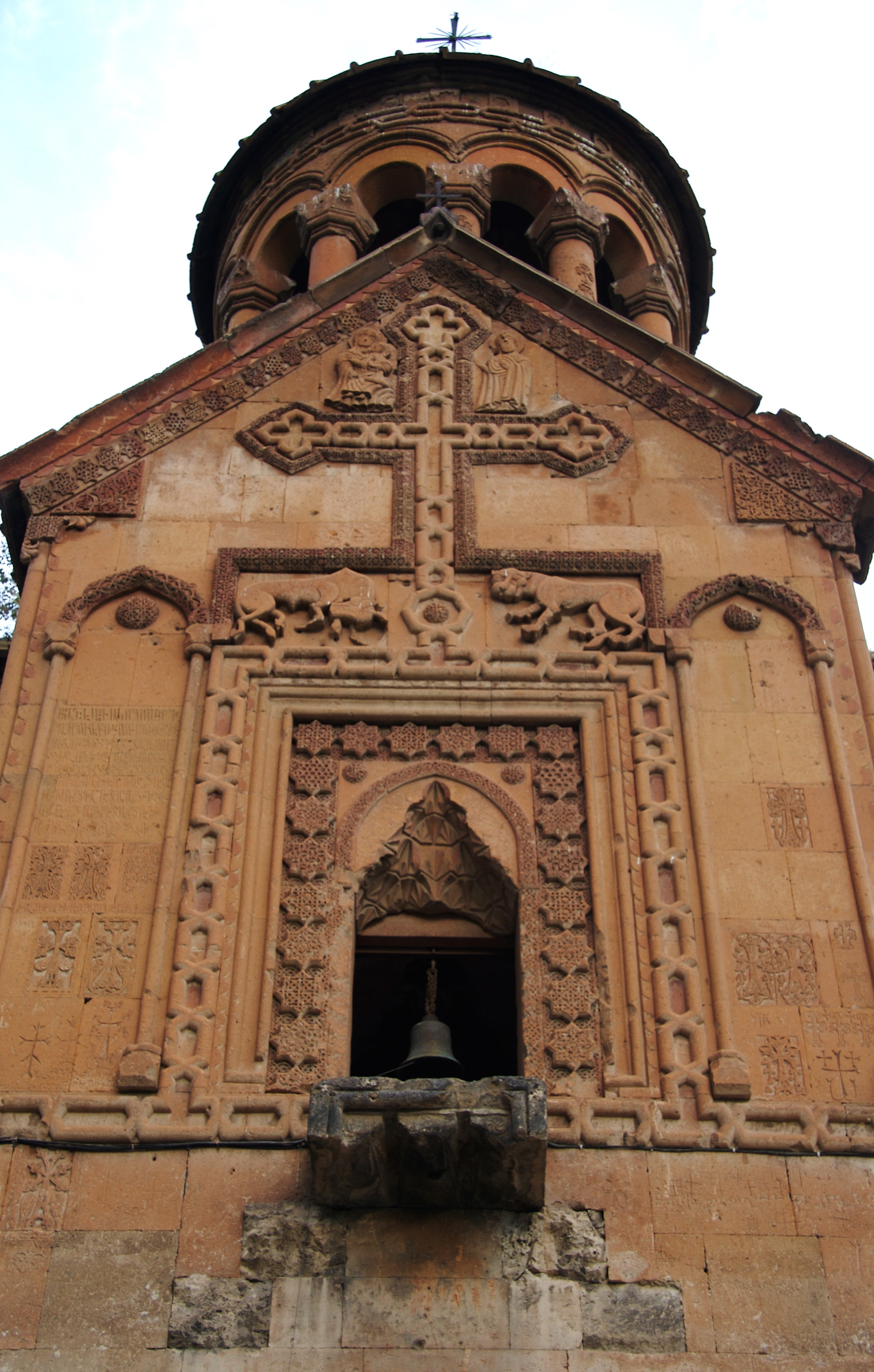
Yeghvard Church, front detail, Armenia

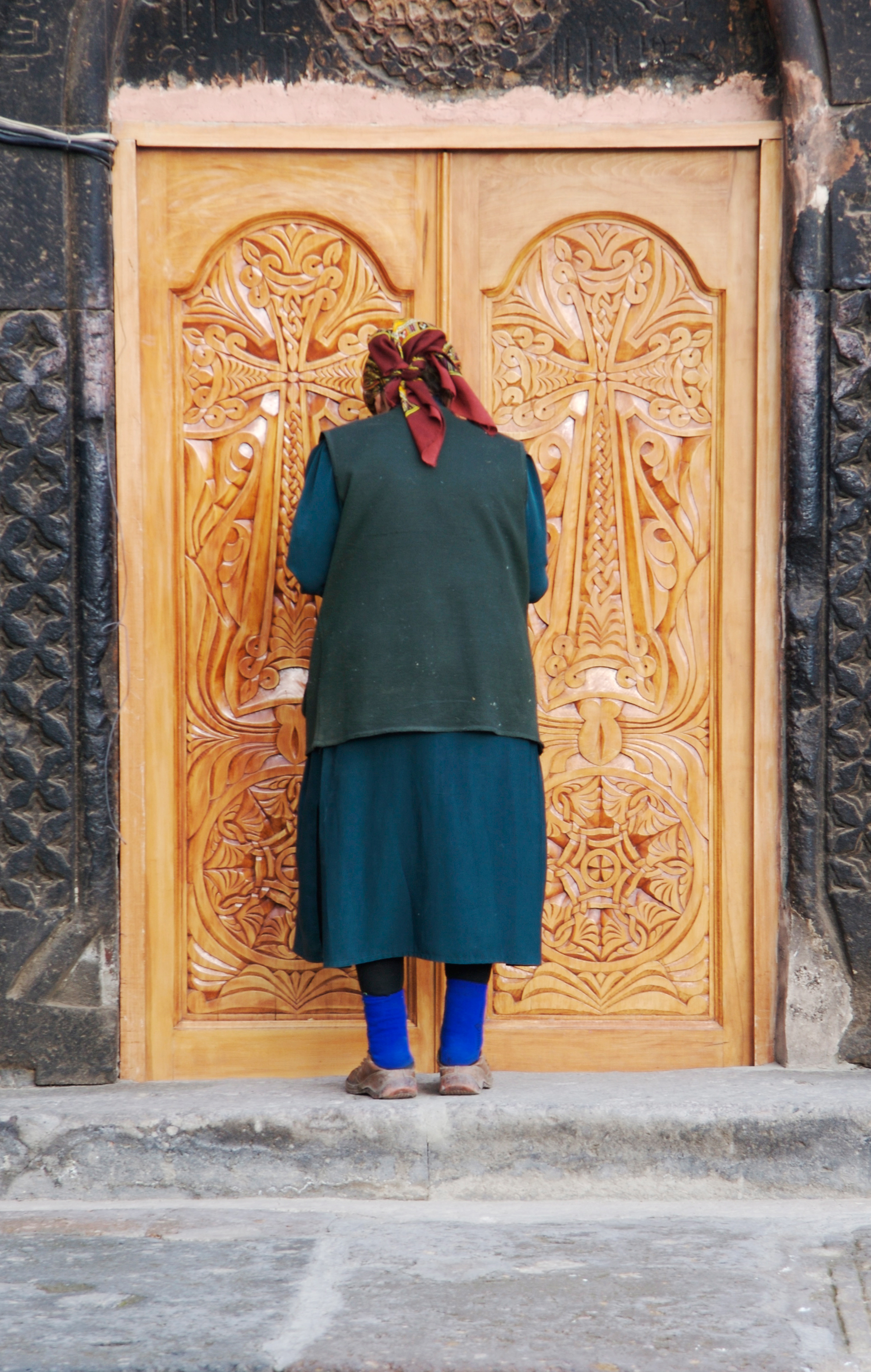
Yeghvard Church, front doors, Armenia

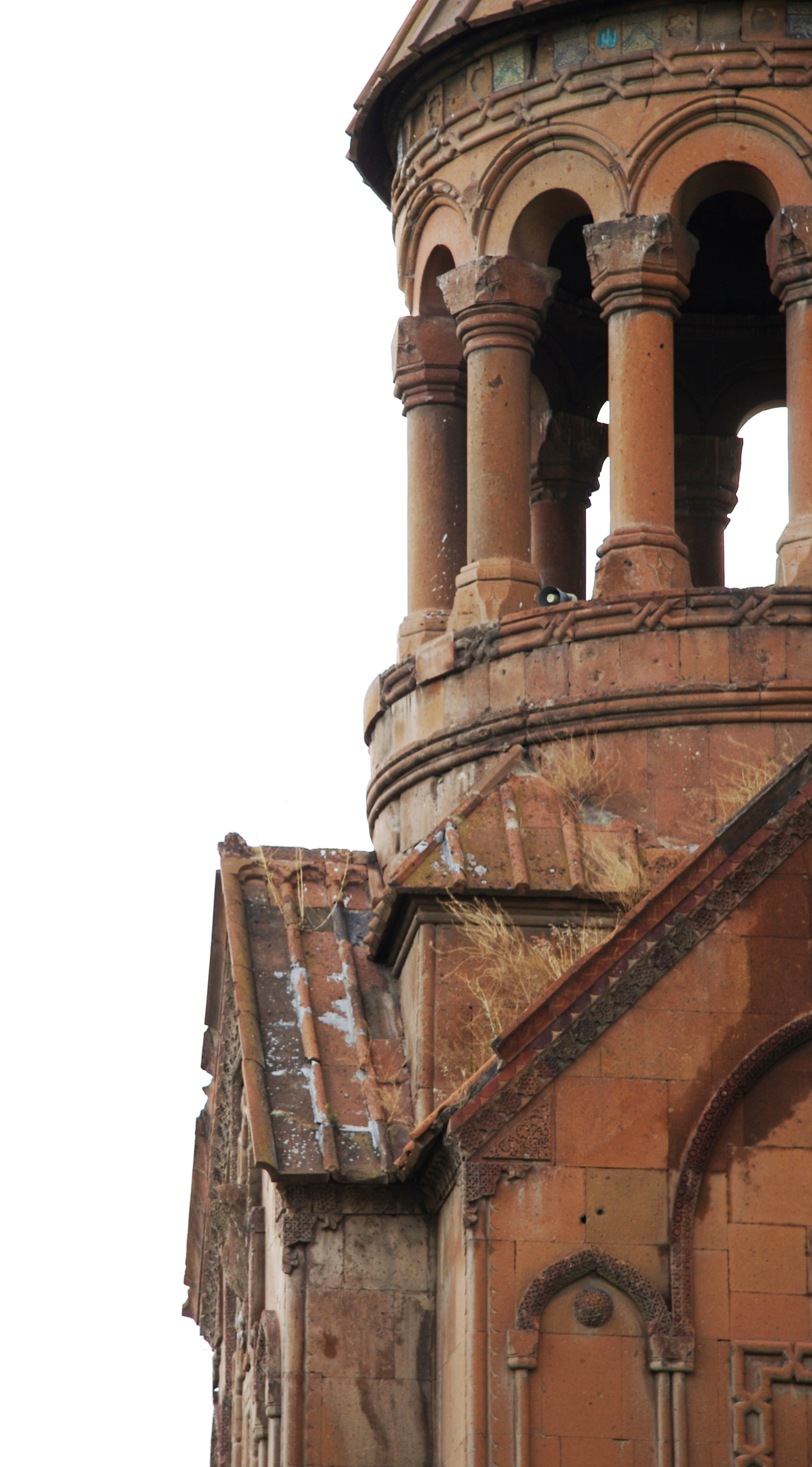
Yeghvard Church roof detail, Armenia

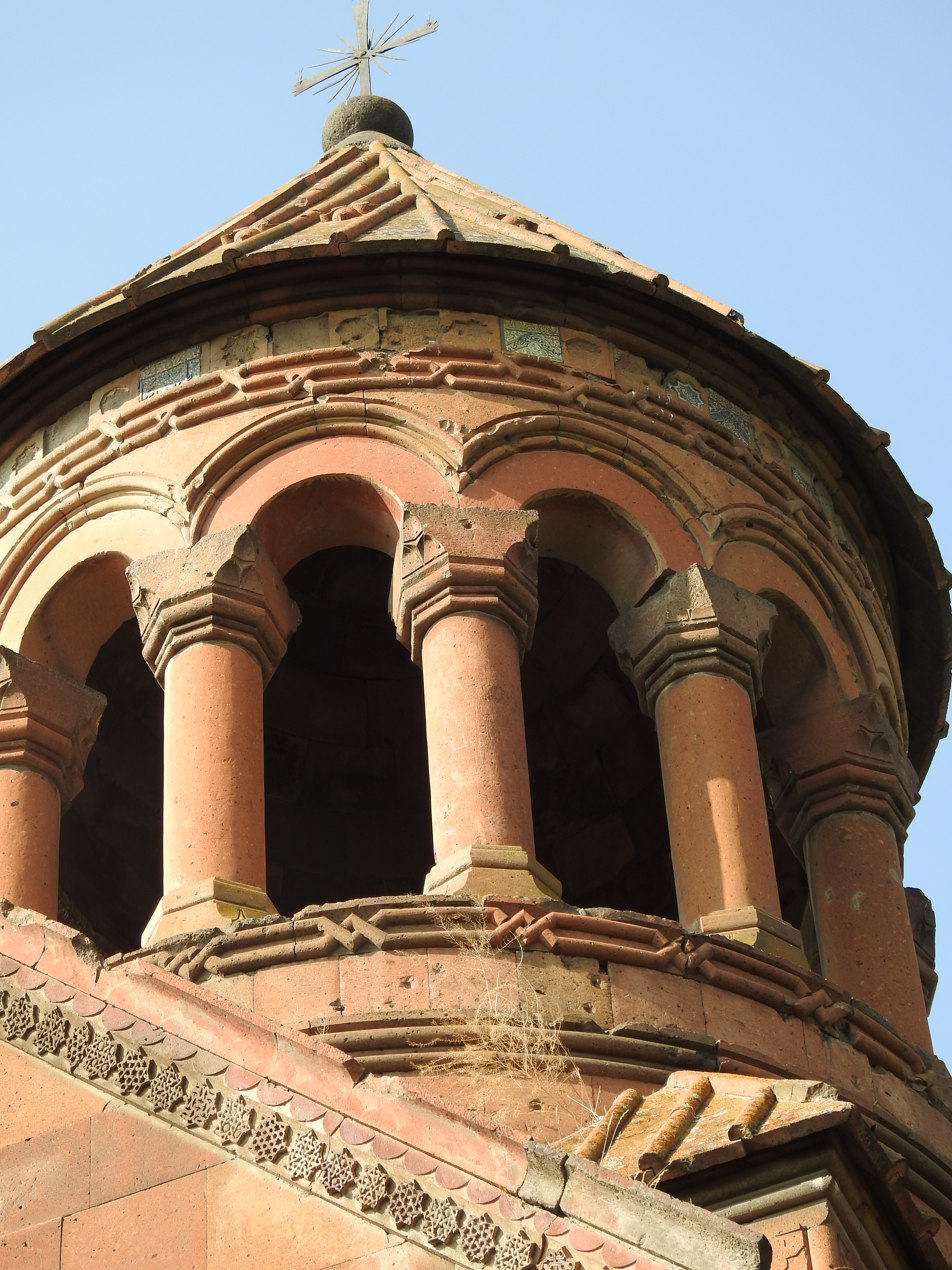

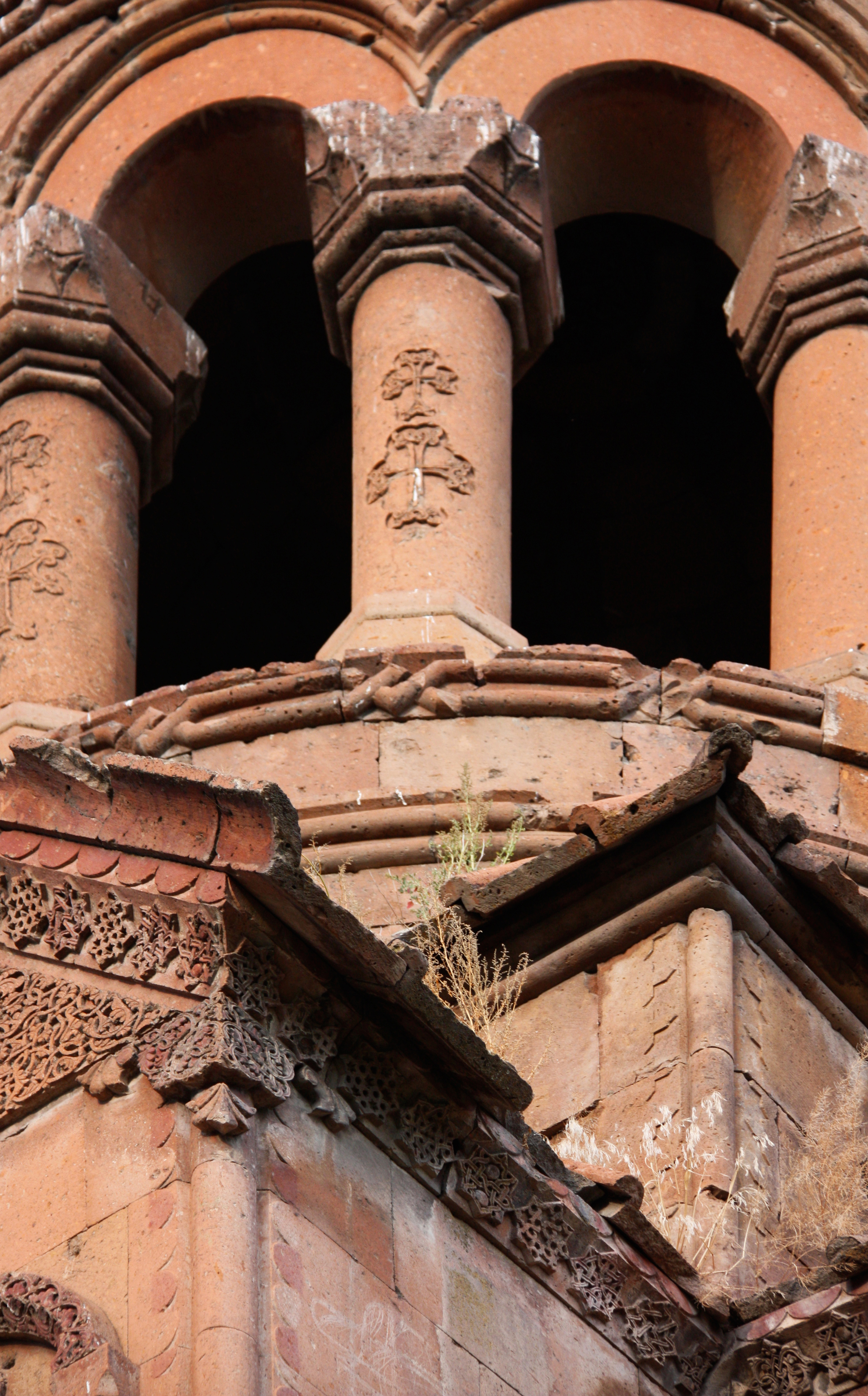
Yeghvard Church, roof and cupola detail, Armenia

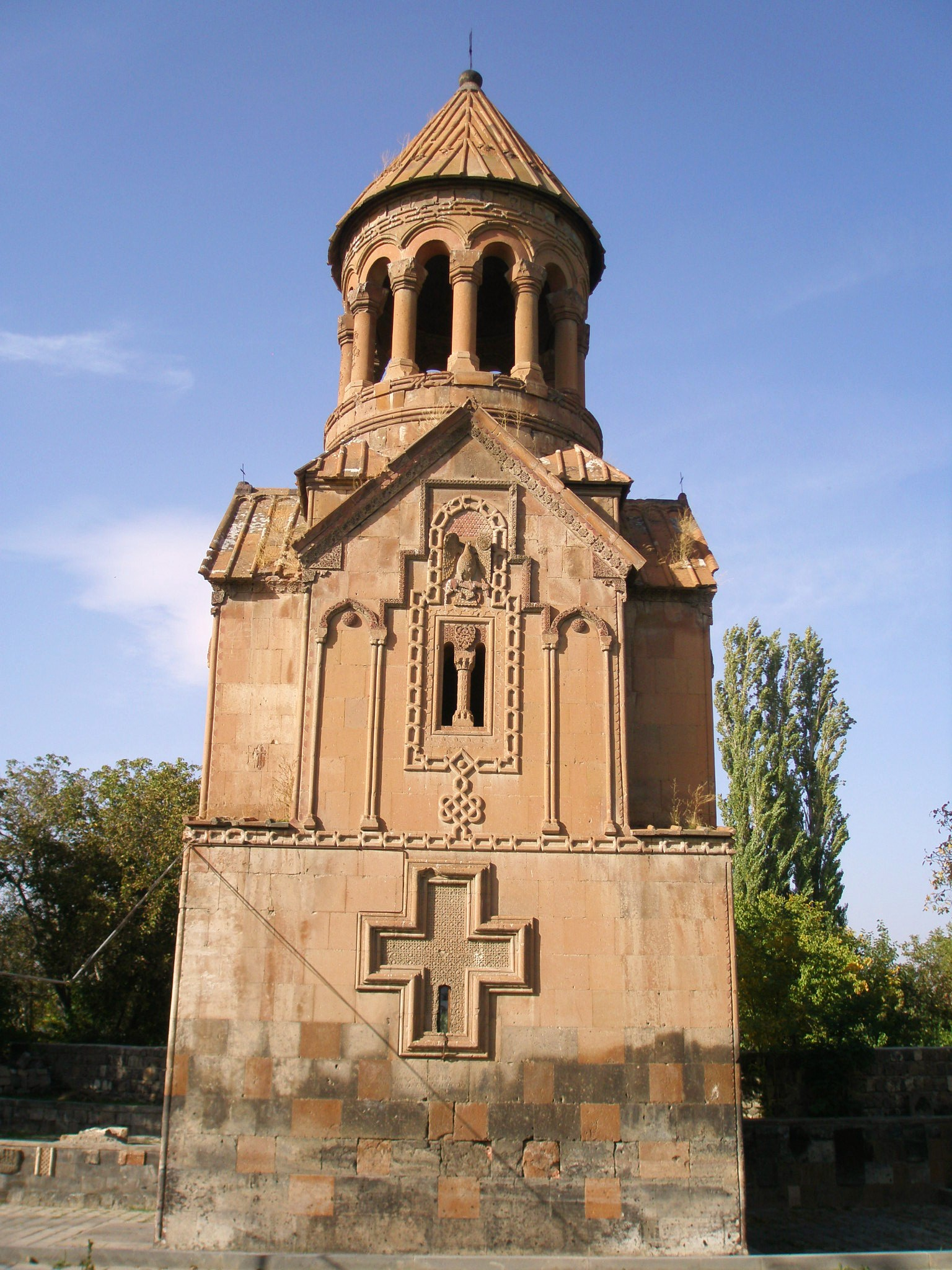
Right façade.

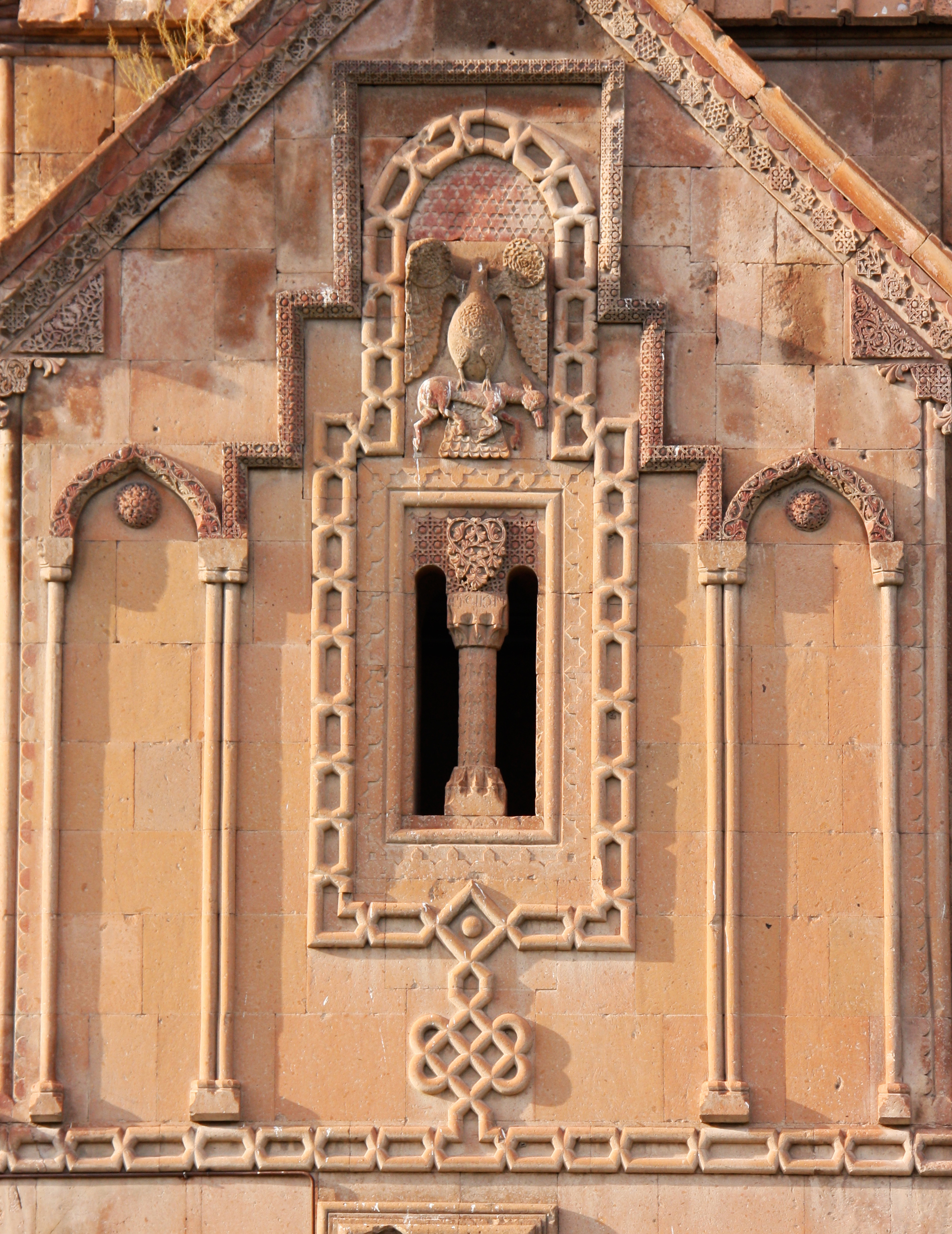
Yeghvard Church, right side detail, Armenia

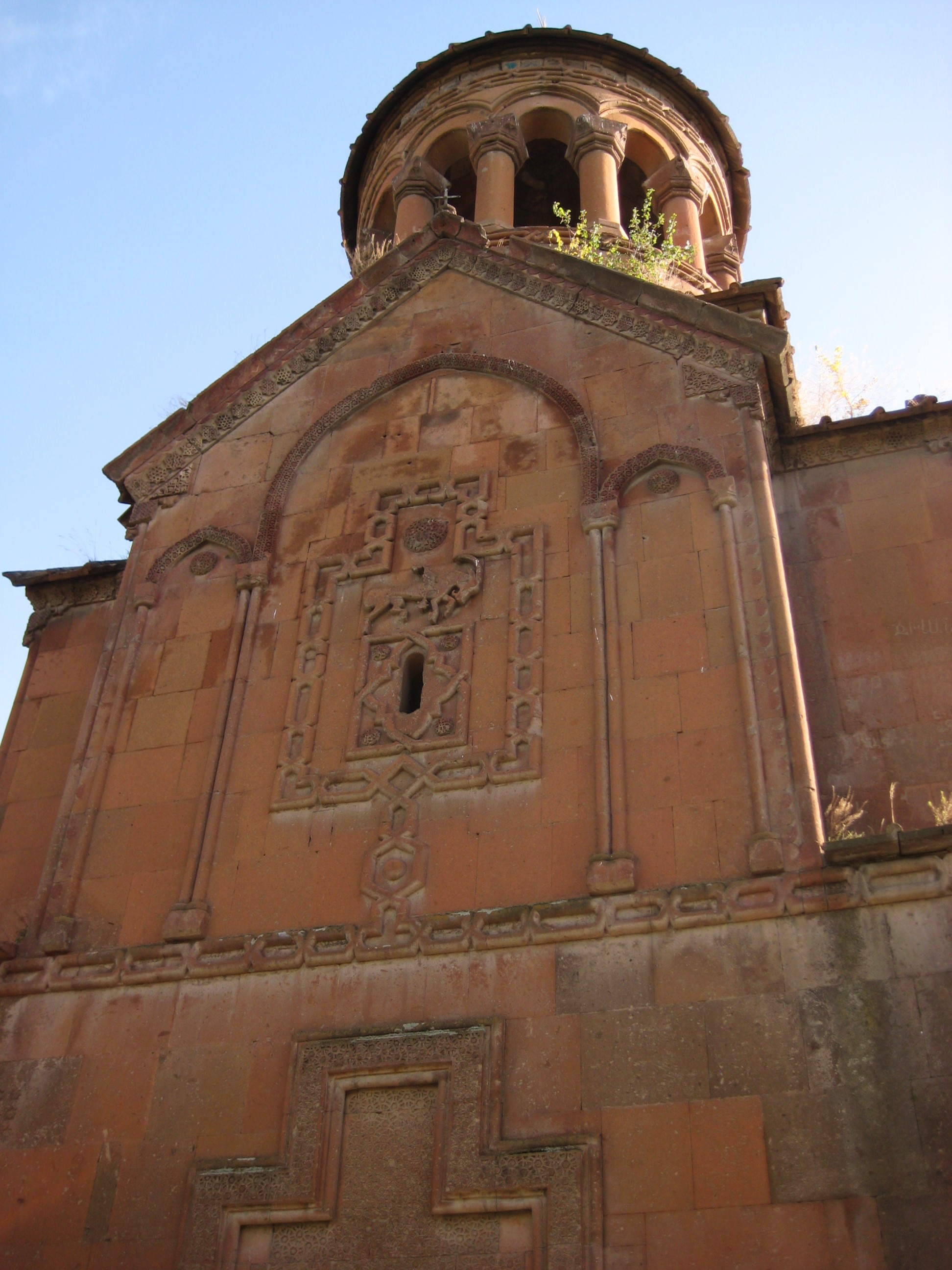
Left façade detail.

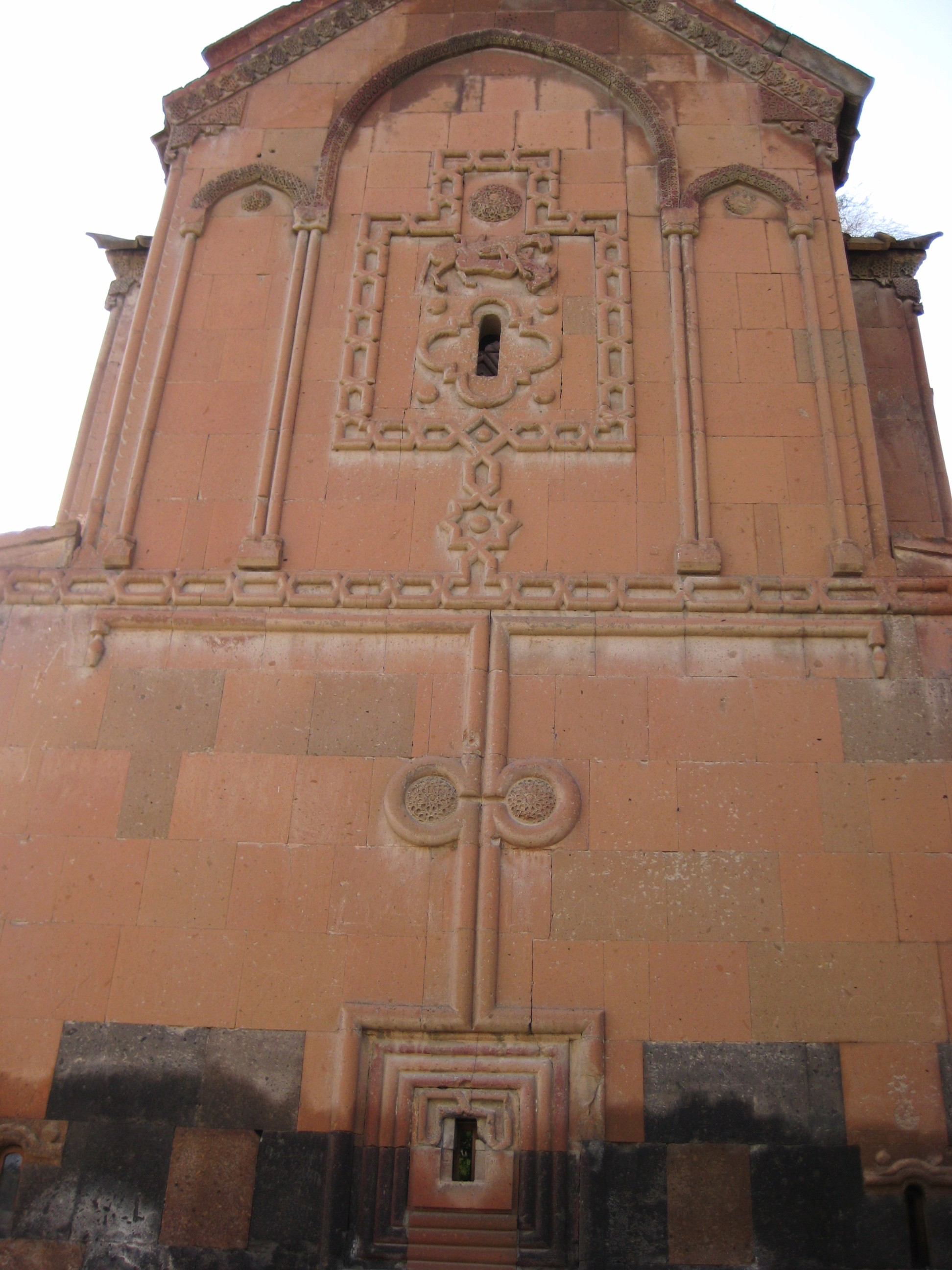
Rear façade detail.

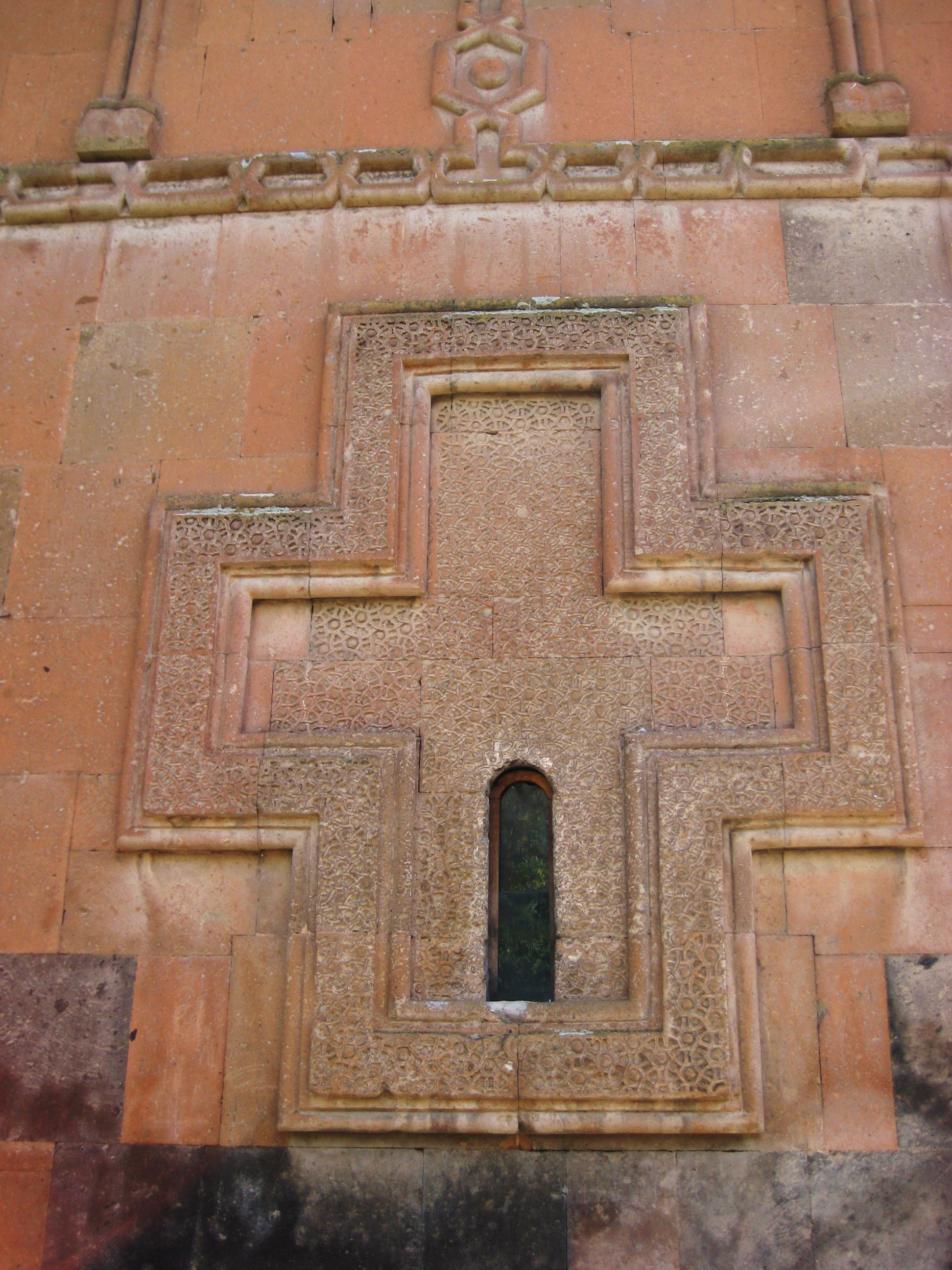
Cross relief detail around window upon the left side of the church.

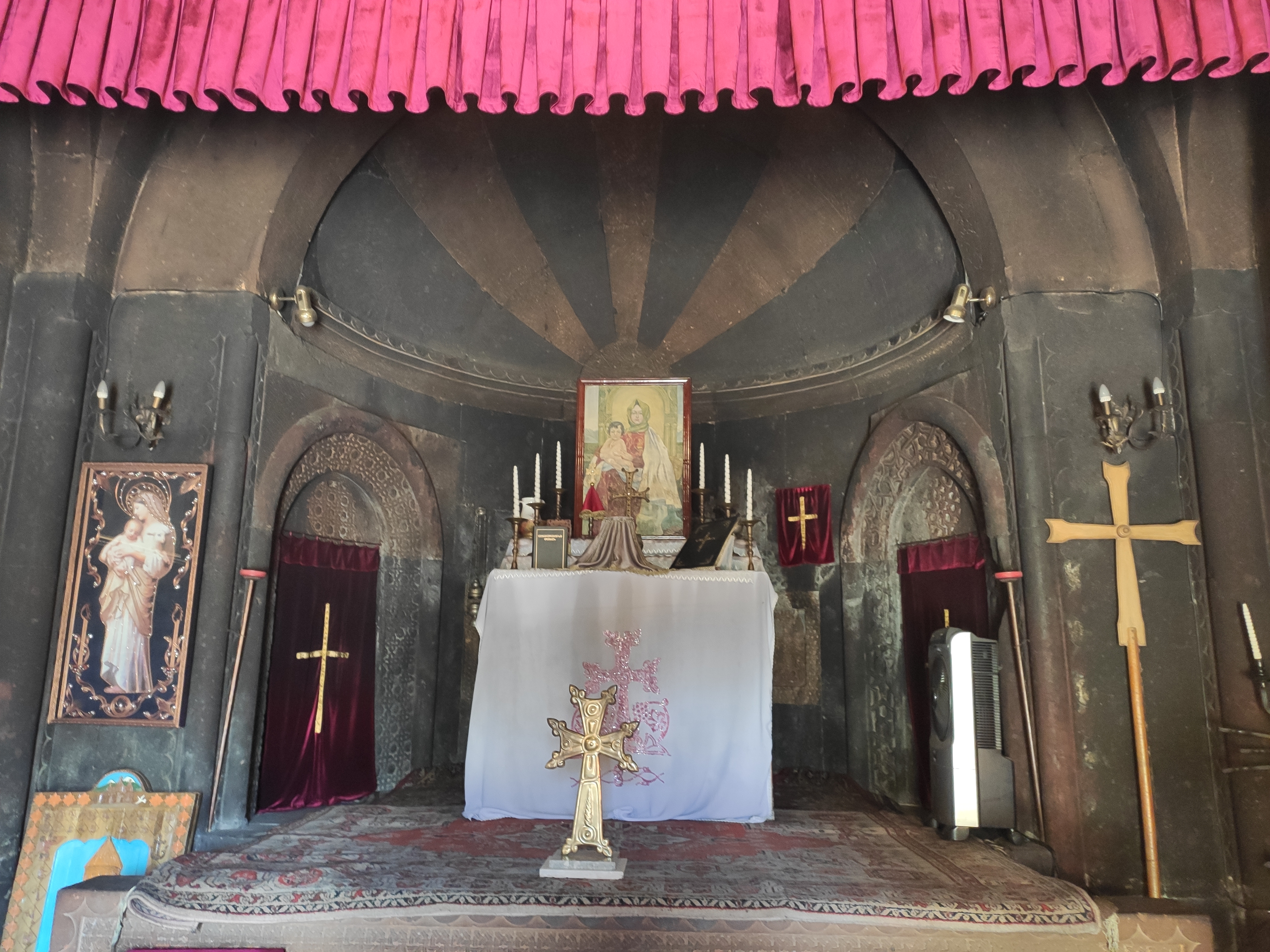

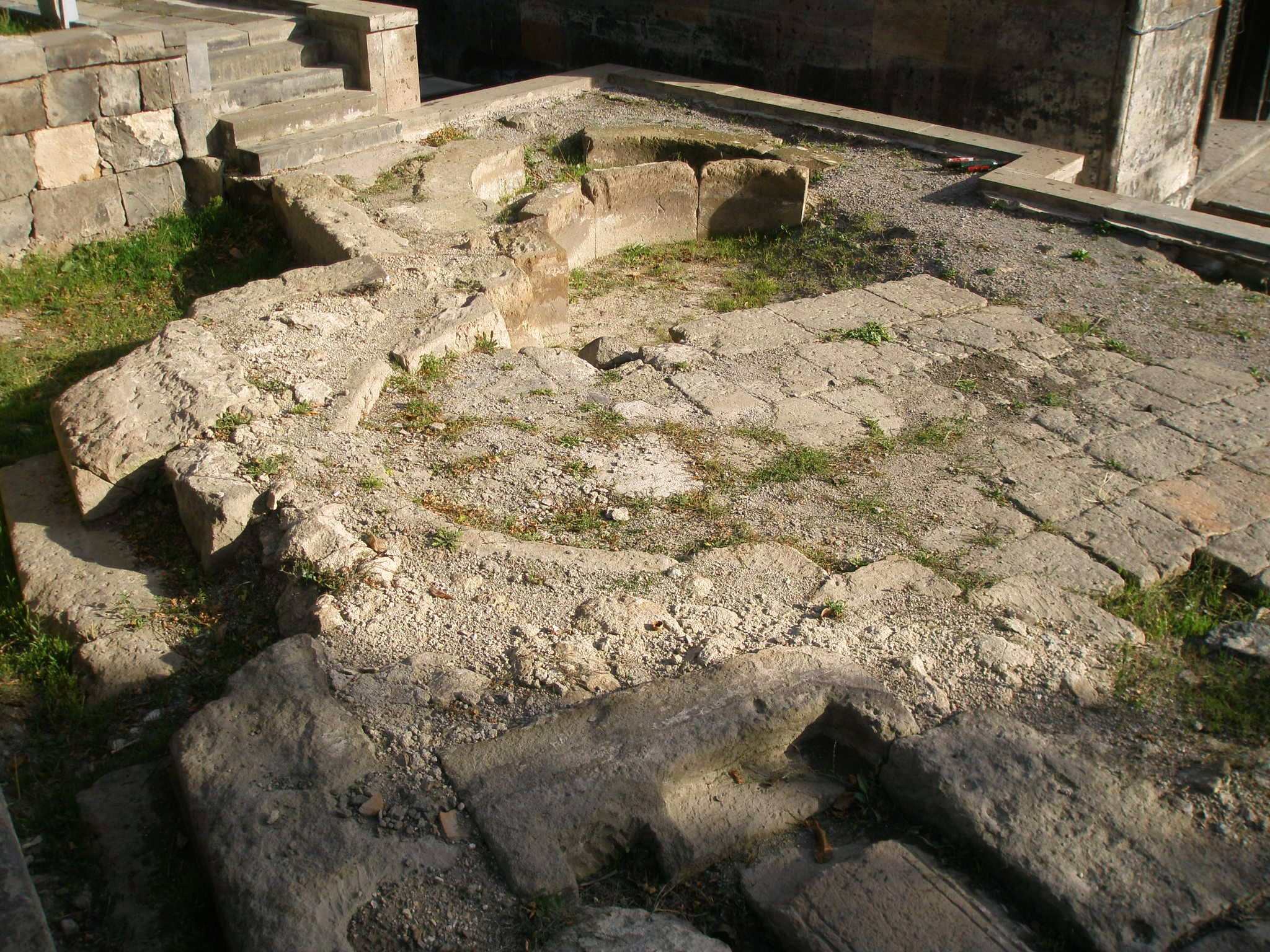
Foundation of a chapel adjacent to the church.
