= Bayburd =

Geghmahovit Գեղմահովիտ Bayburd
- Location within Armenia Location within Ararat
- Coordinates: 40°06′N 44°47′E
- Country: Armenia
- Marz (Province): Ararat
- Time zone: UTC+4 ( )
  - Summer (DST): UTC+5 ( )

Geghmahovit (Armenian: Գեղմահովիտ) or Bayburd (Armenian: Բայբուրդ) is an abandoned town in the Ararat Province of Armenia. Traces of an early medieval armenian Bayburd settlement have been preserved in the Khosrov reserve, at the confluence of the Aghjo and Glan tributaries of the Azat River. Historical and bibliographic information about the village has not been preserved. The only mention is made by the 19th century historian, philologist-geographer Ghevont Alishan, who thinks that the name of the village must have come from Baberd. In the central part of the village, a single-nave basilica church of the 5th century, built of polished gray basalt, is preserved. The carved capitals of the half-ruined church are remarkable: the archetype with an equal crucifix in the central part. Adjacent to the south is the vestibule, which is now in ruins.

According to the inscription preserved in the church structure, the village survived until the 17th century, when Armenians were deported in 1604 during the deportation carried out by Shah Abbas I of Persia Abbas the Great.

The cemetery from the 7th-15th centuries is spread around the church, with dozens of khachkars. In the 1980s, a stone with an inverted Greek inscription was found here during the cleaning works. Translation of the inscription is "Health" and "Happiness". Ruins, from after that period, show that local Azerbaijanis population abandoned the village, presumably after the conflict between Azerbaijan and Armenia (Nagorno-Karabakh conflict).
