= Ara (mountain) =

Mountain in Armenia

- Mount Ara
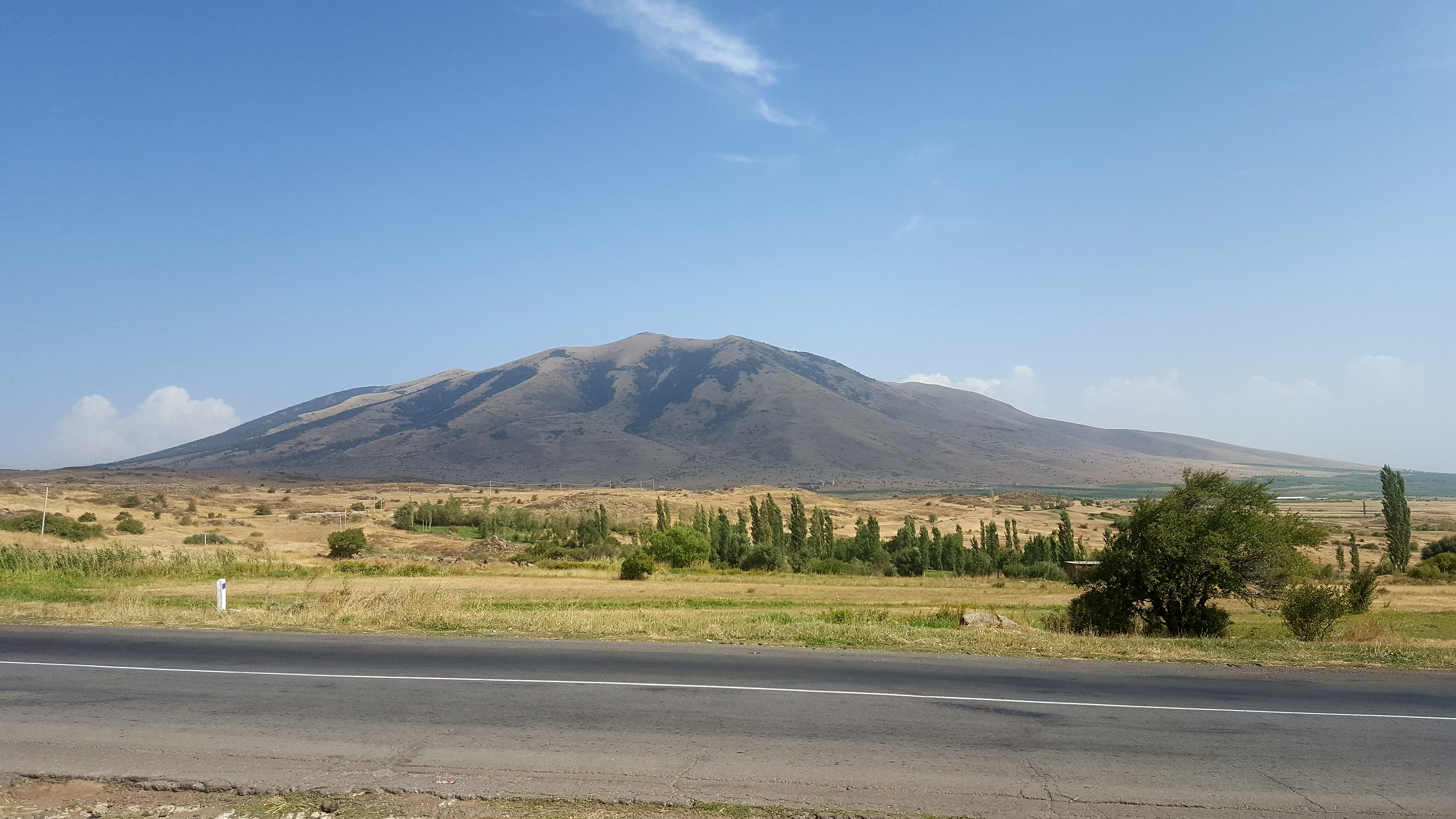

Highest point
- Elevation: 2,614 m (8,576 ft)(other sources mention 2,576 m)
- Coordinates: 40°24′20″N 44°27′08″E

Geography
- Location within Armenia
- Country: Armenia
- Province: Kotayk
- Parent range: Armenian highlands

Mount Ara (Armenian: Արա լեռ, Ara leř) is a polygenetic stratovolcanic cone in Armenia's Kotayk Province. The town of Zoravan and a nearby church, Gharghavank, are located along the mountain's lower slopes. The town of Yeghvard is below the mountain.

Located north of Yerevan, the mountain has a destroyed crater and a base diameter of 9 km at an altitude of 1,900m. The volcano is constructed from lava and agglomerate layers with intrusions of andesite and dacite. The slopes on the north and east are forested. One flank cone south of Arailer has erupted andesite. Andesite also appears in the former crater and lava flows spread to the Hrazdan River. One K-Ar date indicates an age of 1.3 Ma, there are two subsidiary cones Nokhut and Shakhvard. Due to the similarity of the typical Armenian plateaus, it is very similar in terms of height, valley and shape to Mount Göztepe in Muş province.

The mountain has a high biodiversity with Sympecma paedisca, Colias aurorina, Parnassius mnemosyne rjabovi, Armenohelops armeniacus, Cylindronotus erivanus, Conizonia kalashiani, Parnassius apollo kashtshenkoi, Dorcadion kasikoporanum, Papilio alexanor orientalis, Proterebia afra hyrcana and Tetralonia macroglossa represented. Conizonia is endemic on Arailer. The ecosystem is well preserved apart from a minor threat from grazing. The Mountain also holds high variety of bird species, including Golden Eagle, Lesser Spotted Eagle, Caucasian Black Grouse, Red-billed Chough, White-throated Robin, and others. For the reason, the area was recognized as Important Bird Area.

== Gallery ==
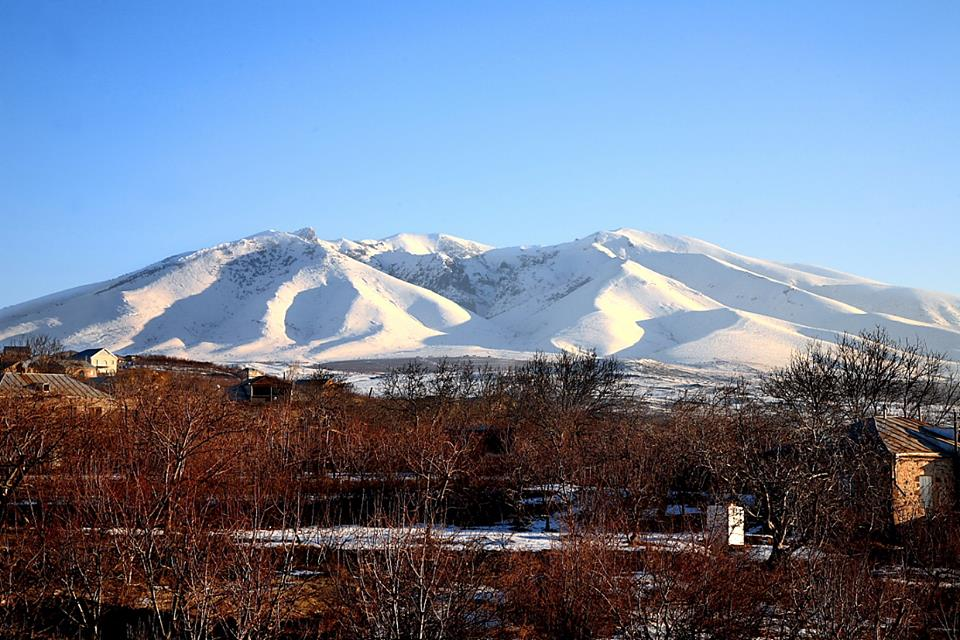
Mount Ara

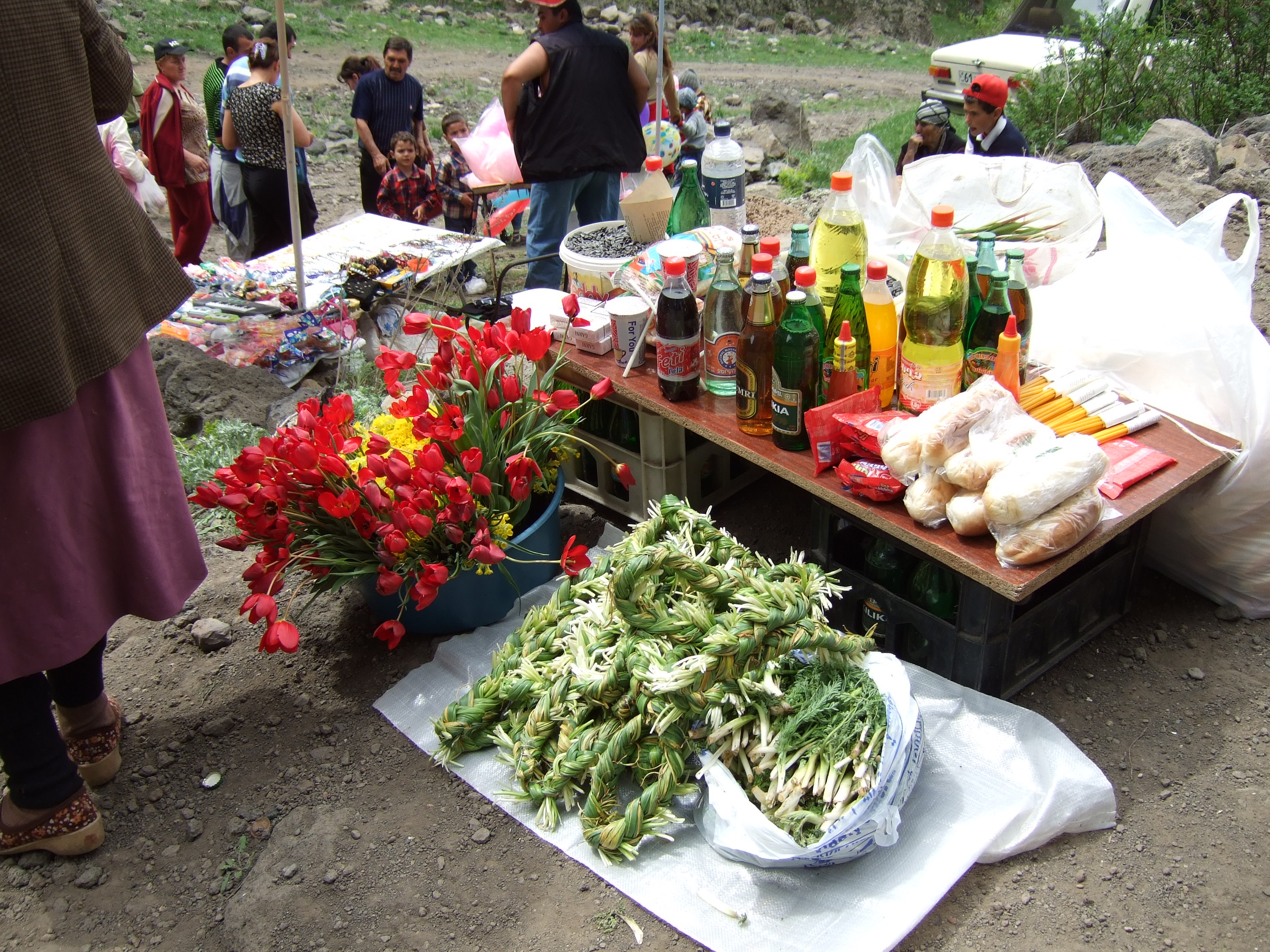
Wild mountain sorrel, poppies, Chaerophyllum macrospermum and other items of tribute sold on Mount Ara to the pilgrims of Tsaghkevank (Kuys Varvara) 40 days after Resurrection Day (Easter). Sorrel is often braided in this fashion in Armenia and Artsakh and can be dried for extended use

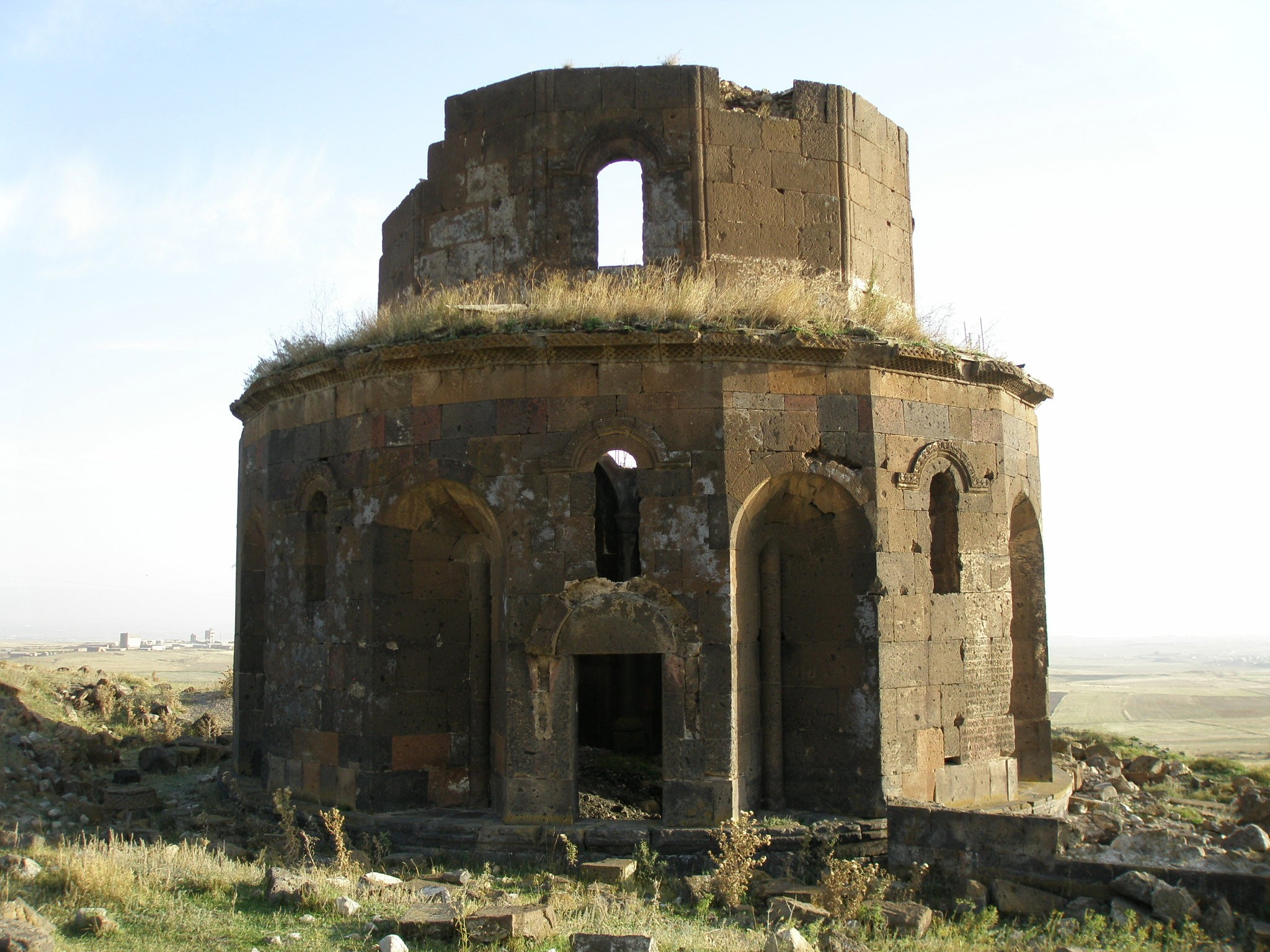
Ruins of Gharghavank on a hillside of Mount Ara

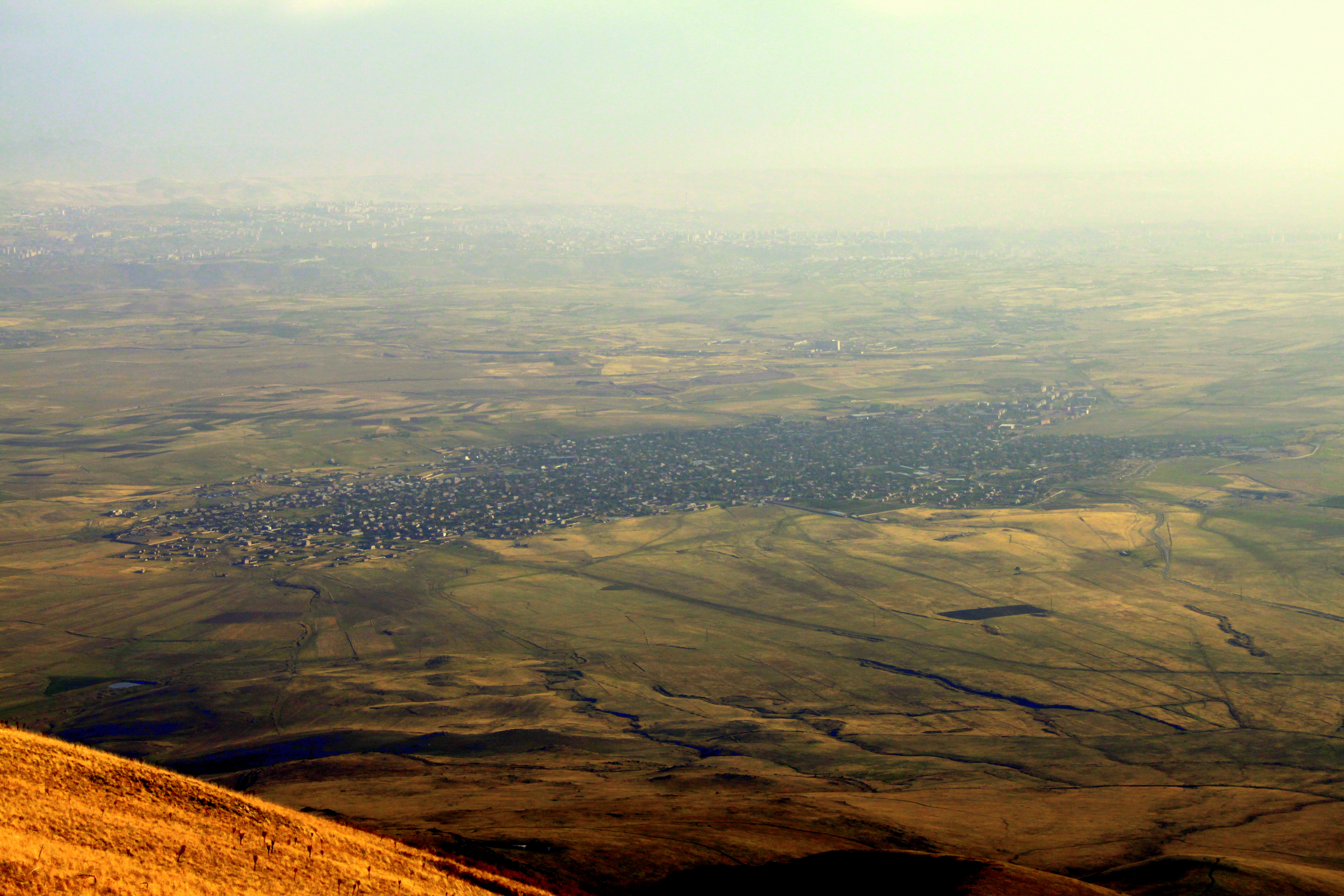
View of Yeghvard from Mount Ara

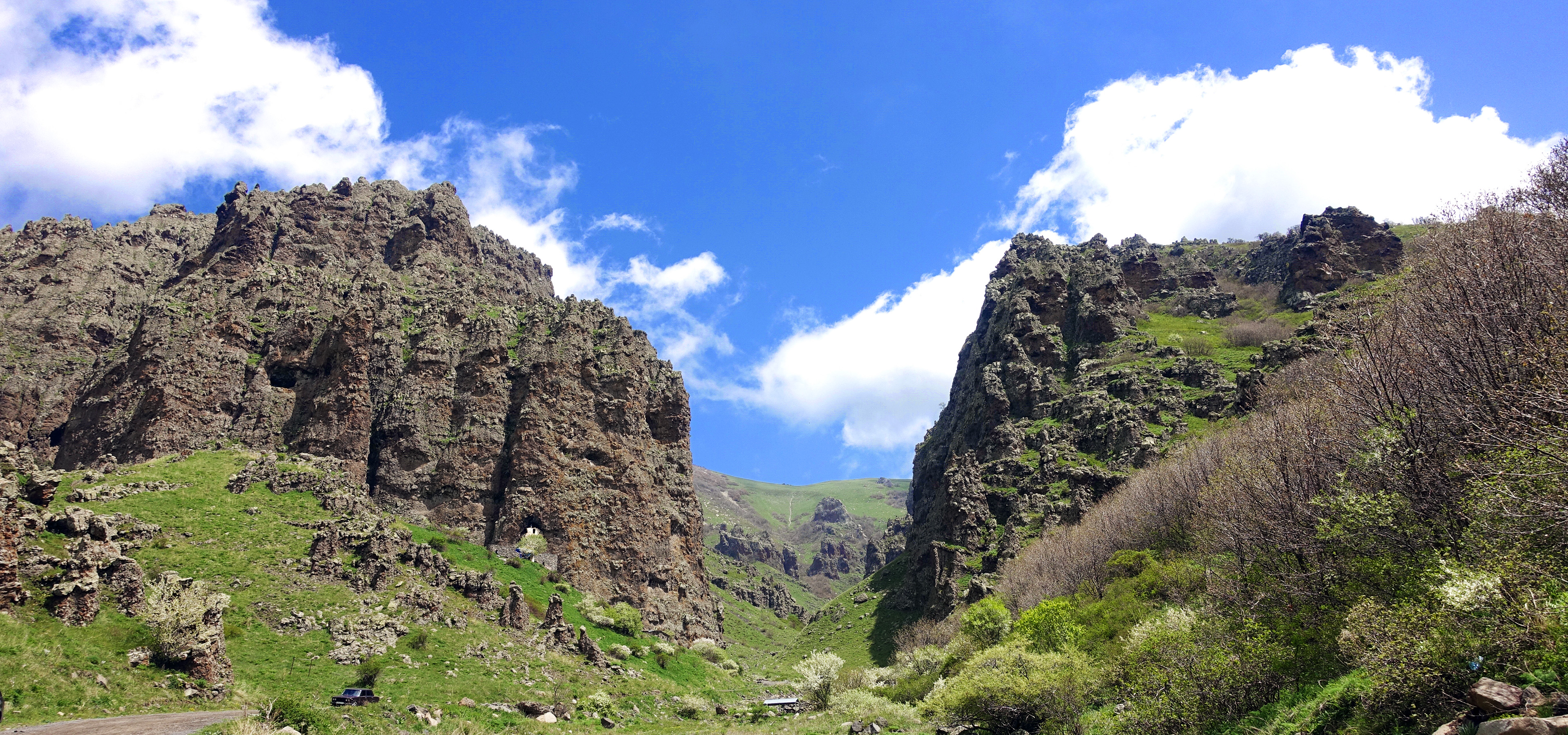
Rock formations
