= Phytoecia demeltiana =

Scientific classification
- Domain: Eukaryota
- Kingdom: Animalia
- Phylum: Arthropoda
- Class: Insecta
- Order: Coleoptera
- Suborder: Polyphaga
- Infraorder: Cucujiformia
- Family: Cerambycidae
- Genus: Phytoecia
- Species: P. demeltiana

Binomial name
- Phytoecia demeltiana Lazarev, 2016

Synonyms
- Helladia demelti Sama, 2003; Phytoecia demelti (Sama, 2003) nec Breuning, 1973

Species of beetle

Phytoecia (Helladia) demeltiana is a species of beetle in the family Cerambycidae. It is known from Turkey. Helladia demelti Sama, 2003 ("Asia Minor, Silifke"), junior secondary homonym - invalid name, not Phytoecia (Coptosia) demelti (Breuning, 1973)
Phytoecia (Coptosia) demelti (Breuning, 1973) was described as Conizonia Fairmaire, 1864, though now it is generally accepted as Phytoecia (Coptosia). Phytoecia (Helladia) demelti Sama, 2003 was described as Helladia Fairmaire, 1864, though now it is generally accepted as Phytoecia (Helladia), so Helladia demelti Sama, 2003 is junior secondary homonym.
