= Conizonia guerinii =

Scientific classification
- Domain: Eukaryota
- Kingdom: Animalia
- Phylum: Arthropoda
- Class: Insecta
- Order: Coleoptera
- Suborder: Polyphaga
- Infraorder: Cucujiformia
- Family: Cerambycidae
- Genus: Conizonia
- Species: C. guerinii

Binomial name
- Conizonia guerinii (Breme, 1840)

Synonyms
- Phytoecia (Coptosia) guerinii (Breme) Ganglbauer, 1884; Phytoecia guerinii (Breme) Lucas, 1849; Saperda cinerea Guérin-Ménéville, 1841 nec Olivier, 1795; Saperda guerinii Breme, 1840

Species of beetle

Conizonia guerinii is a species of beetle in the family Cerambycidae. It was described by Ferdinando Arborio Gattinara di Breme in 1840, originally under the genus Saperda. It is known from Tunisia and Algeria. It is named for Félix Édouard Guérin-Méneville.

Conizonia guerinii measure 16–21 mm (0.63–0.83 in).

== Varietas ==
Three varieties can be recognized:

- Conizonia guerini var. luteopubens Pic, 1918
- Conizonia guerinii var. glauca (Erichson, 1841)
- Conizonia guerinii var. lineata Pic, 1918
