= Zoravar Church =

Zoravar Church can refer to:

- Zoravor Surp Astvatsatsin Church, late 17th-century three-nave basilica type church located in Yerevan, Armenia
- Gharghavank, late 7th-century central-plan aisled tetra-conch (circular) church located just outside Zoravan in the Kotayk Province of Armenia
