= Papilio phegea =

Papilio phegea may refer to:

- Elymniopsis
- Proterebia afra
