= Conizonia anularis =

Scientific classification
- Kingdom: Animalia
- Phylum: Arthropoda
- Class: Insecta
- Order: Coleoptera
- Suborder: Polyphaga
- Infraorder: Cucujiformia
- Family: Cerambycidae
- Genus: Conizonia
- Species: C. anularis

Binomial name
- Conizonia anularis Holzschuh, 1984

Synonyms
- Pteromallosia anularis (Holzschuh, 1984); Conizonia annularis Holzschuh, 1984 (misspelling); Conizonia anulifera Löbl & Smetana, 2013

Species of beetle

Conizonia anularis is a species of beetle in the family Cerambycidae. It was described by Holzschuh in 1984. It is known from Turkey.
