= Conizonia simia =

Scientific classification
- Kingdom: Animalia
- Phylum: Arthropoda
- Class: Insecta
- Order: Coleoptera
- Suborder: Polyphaga
- Infraorder: Cucujiformia
- Family: Cerambycidae
- Genus: Conizonia
- Species: C. simia

Binomial name
- Conizonia simia Sama, 2005

Synonyms
- Conizonia allardi (Fairmaire) Peyerimhoff, 1919

Species of beetle

Conizonia simia is a species of beetle in the family Cerambycidae. It was described by Sama in 2005. It is known from Algeria.
