= Conizonia mounai =

Scientific classification
- Kingdom: Animalia
- Phylum: Arthropoda
- Class: Insecta
- Order: Coleoptera
- Suborder: Polyphaga
- Infraorder: Cucujiformia
- Family: Cerambycidae
- Genus: Conizonia
- Species: C. mounai

Binomial name
- Conizonia mounai Sama, 2005

Synonyms
- Conizonia poweli (Pic) Villiers, 1946

Species of beetle

Conizonia mounai is a species of beetle in the family Cerambycidae. It was described by Sama in 2005. It is known from Morocco.
