= Yeghvard =

City in Kotayk, Armenia

Yeghvard Եղվարդ
- Town
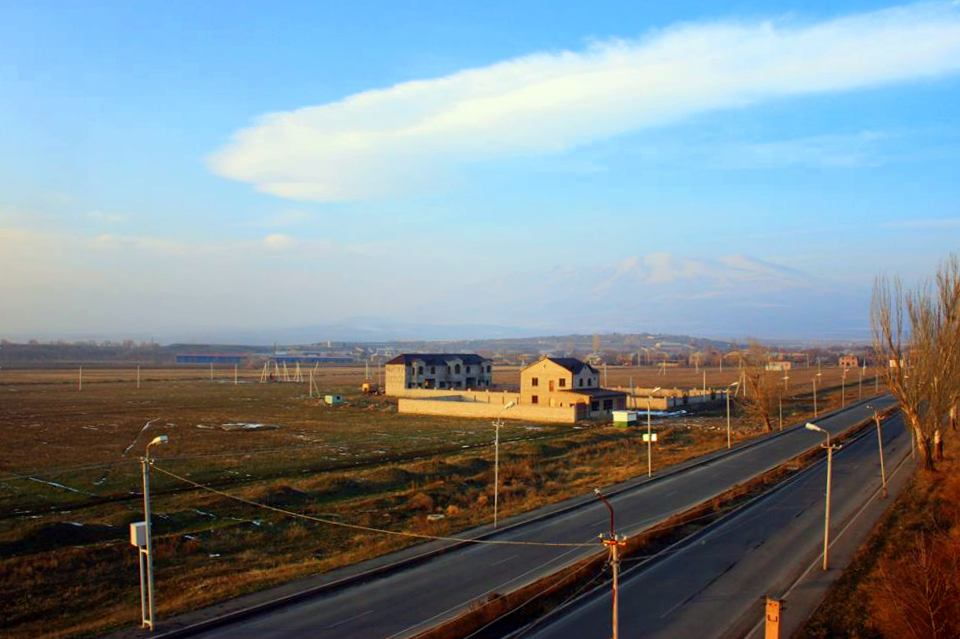
- Yeghvard with Mount Ara in the background

- Location within Armenia
- Coordinates: 40°19′18″N 44°28′53″E
- Country: Armenia
- Province: Kotayk
- First mentioned: 6th century

Area
  - Total: 7 km^{2} (2.7 sq mi)
- Elevation: 1,330 m (4,360 ft)

Population (2022 census)
  - Total: 12,279
  - Density: 1,800/km^{2} (4,500/sq mi)
- Time zone: UTC+4
- Website: Official website

Yeghvard (Armenian: Եղվարդ) is a town and urban municipal community in the Kotayk Province of Armenia. It is located 39 kilometres southwest of the provincial centre Hrazdan. As of the 2022 census, the town had a population of 12,279.

== Etymology ==
There are several folk traditions about the origin of the town's name. According to one of these, the name derives from the fact that the fields around Yeghvard were once covered in forests and gardens, and that the village was rich in oils (ewgh or egh in Old Armenian) and flowers, particularly roses (vard in Armenian). Another tradition holds that the people on Noah's Ark exclaimed eghev ard (Now it has happened!) when they saw the base of Mount Ara emerge from under the flood waters, hence the place was called Yeghvard. Yet another tradition connects the name with geghard, the name of the Holy Lance in Armenian; the relic is supposed to have been kept in a nearby hermitage. Yeghvard is also the Armenian name of the fruit of a tree called yeghvrdi, possibly to be identified with Betula pubescens (downy birch).

== History ==
Yeghvard is one of the oldest settlements in Armenia. The name Yeghvard was first mentioned during the 6th century AD. It first appeared in the historic chronicles of Catholicos Moses II of Yeghvard, who reigned between 574 and 604 as the head of the Mother See of Holy Etchmiadzin. However, the area of Yeghvard has been settled since the beginning of the 2nd millennium BC, based on the remains of the ancient settlement Seghanasar, located to the west of Yeghvard.

During the ancient Kingdom of Armenia, the area of modern-day Yeghvard was part of the Kotayk canton of Ayrarat province.

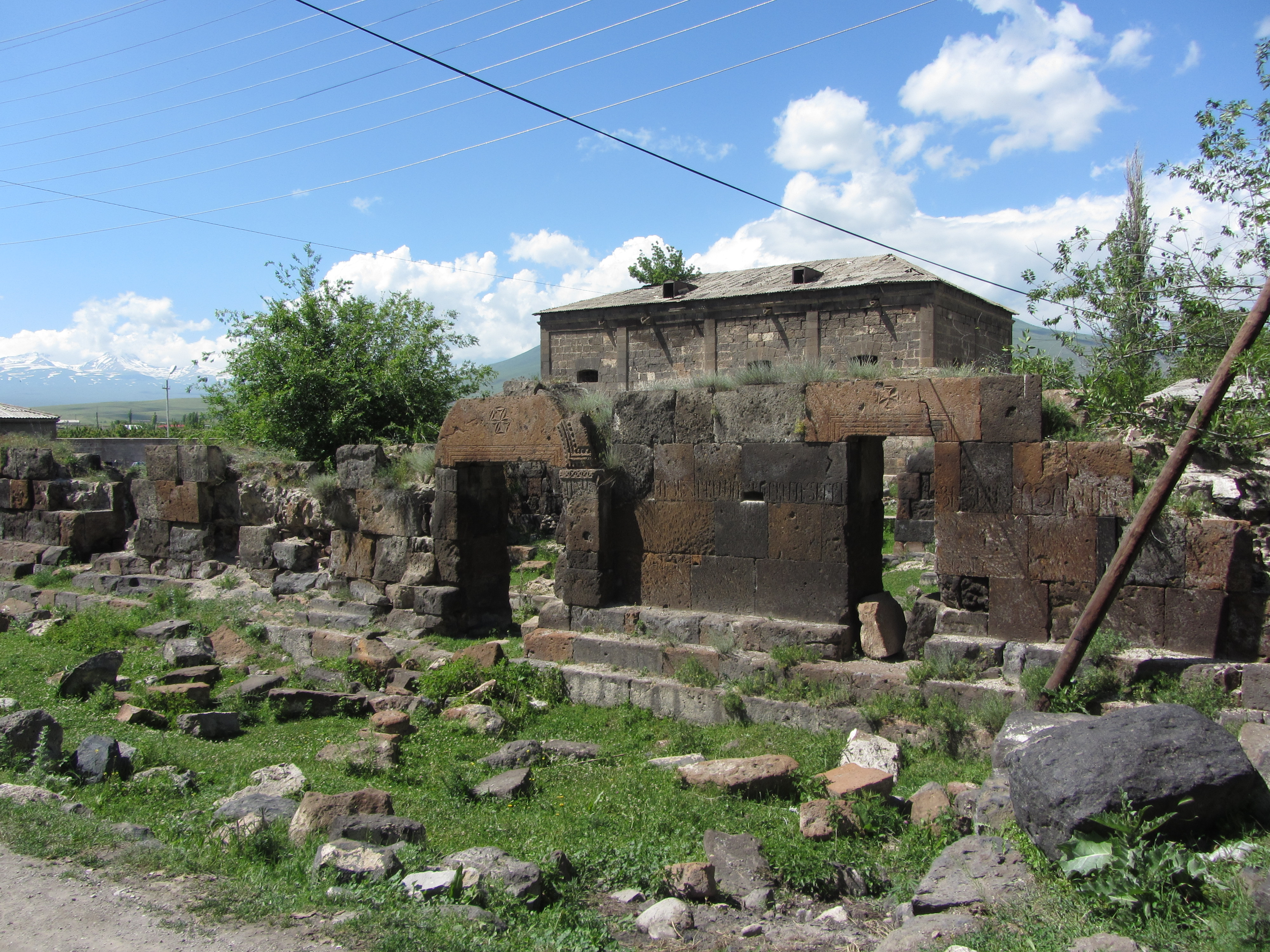
The ruins of the Katoghike Church of the 5-6th centuries

After the Christianization of Armenia in 301, the region of Kotayk became one of the important centres of the Armenian Church. The ruins of the Katoghike Church of Yeghvard are still found at the centre of the town. It was a large three-nave basilica built during the 5th and 6th centuries, under the rule of the Amatuni Armenian noble dynasty.

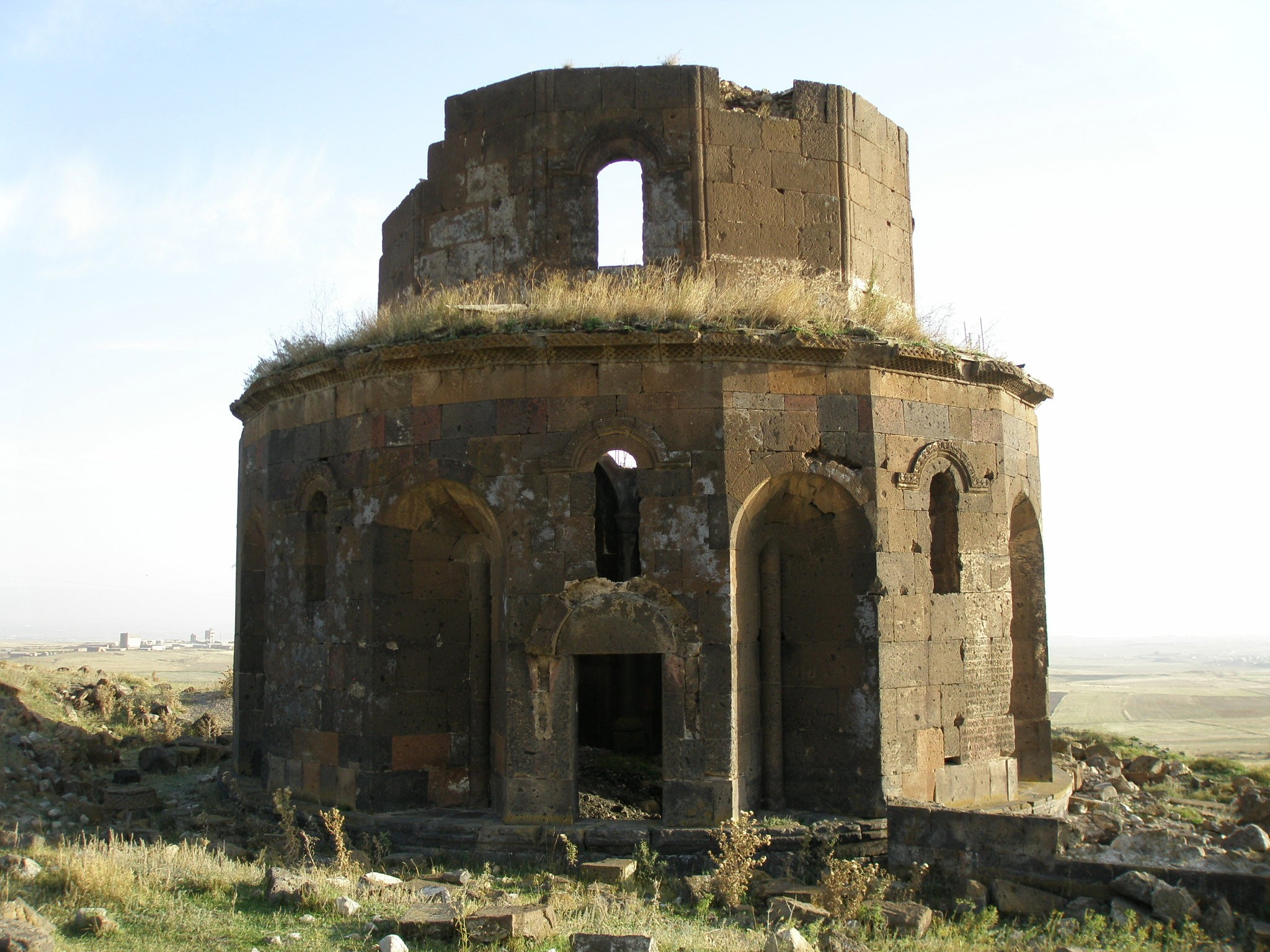
Saint Theodore Monastery

The remains of the 7th-century Saint Theodore Monastery, also known as Gharghavank of Zoravan, are found at the northeast of the town. According to the Catholicos of All Armenians John V the Historian, the monastic complex was built by prince Grigor I Mamikonian, between 666 and 685. Between the 7th and 9th centuries, Armenia suffered from the Arab Islamic occupation.

By the end of the 9th century, the village of Yeghvard became part of the newly established Bagratid Kingdom of Armenia. Between the 11th and 15th centuries, Yeghvard suffered from the Seljuk, Mongol, Aq Qoyunlu and Kara Koyunlu invasions, respectively.

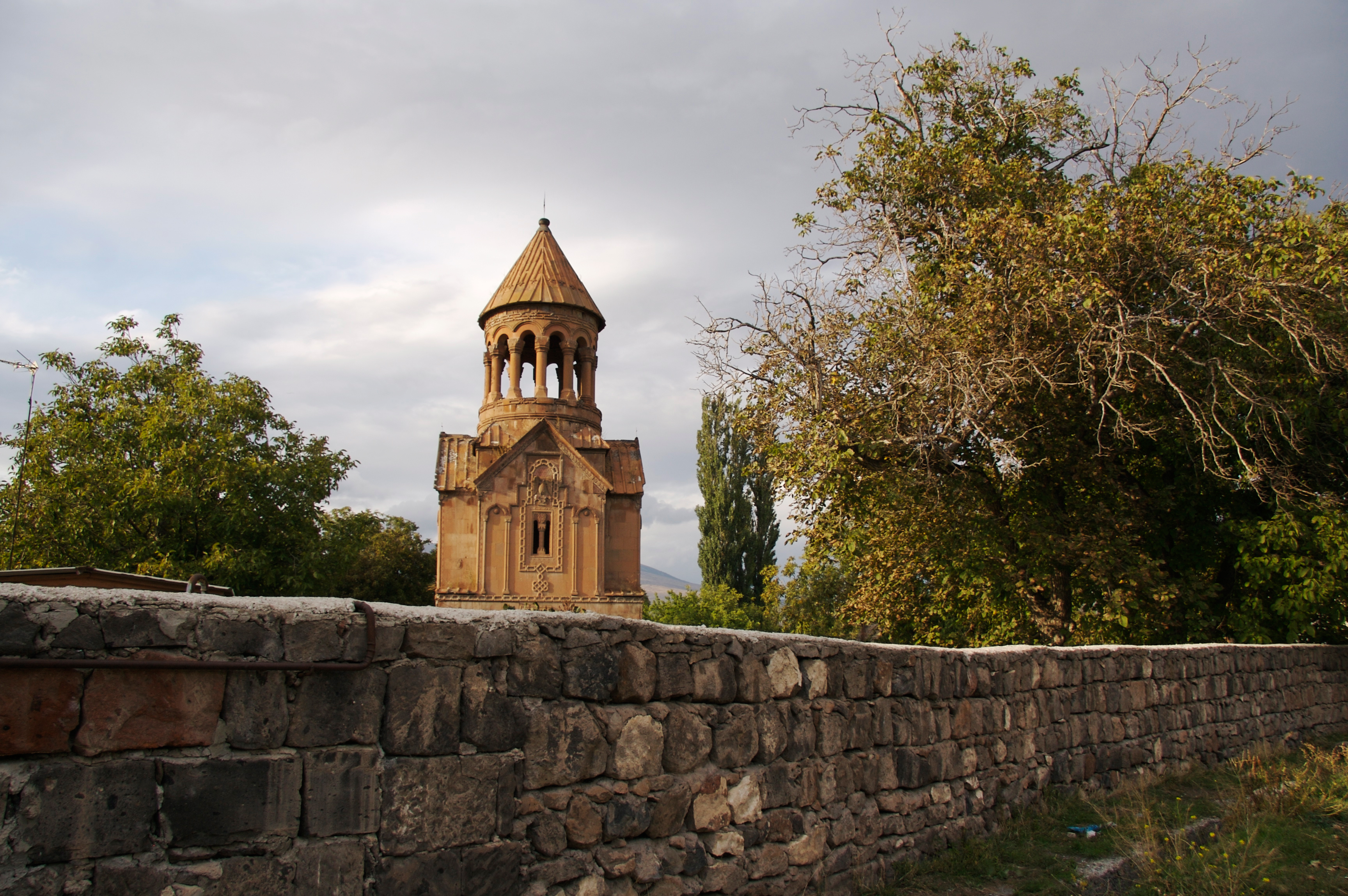
Holy Mother of God Church of 1301

According to the Armenian historian Stepanos Orbelian of the 13th century, Yeghvard and the surrounding areas became part of the Kingdom of Georgian. Later, the region was granted to prince Liparit Orbeli by prince Ivane Mkhargrdzeli. The Church of the Holy Mother of God Of Yeghvard is the most notable historic structure of the town. It was built and completed in 1301 as an alternative church of the nearby ruined basilica church of Katoghike. Many old khachkars and graves are found around the church.

At the beginning of the 16th century, the territory of modern-day Kotayk region became part of the Erivan Beglarbegi within the Safavid Persia. During that period, Yeghvard was known as Murattepe by the Persians and Turkic people. In June 1735, it became the location of the Battle of Yeghevārd at the final stages of the Perso-Ottoman War of 1730–1735.

After the Russian conquest of Armenia in 1828, Yeghvard became part of the Armenian Oblast and subsequently of the Erivan Governorate formed in 1850.

After the Sovietization of Armenia in 1920, Yeghvard remained as a rural settlement until 1972 when it was given the status of an urban-type settlement to become the centre of Nairi raion. Yeghvard witnessed a significant industrial growth during the 1980s, with the formation of the "Nairishin" building materials plant and the Yeghvard shoes factory.

In 1995, it was given the status of an urban settlement by the government of independent Armenia. Many new industrial firms were formed in Yeghvard during the 1st decade of the 21st century.

== Geography ==
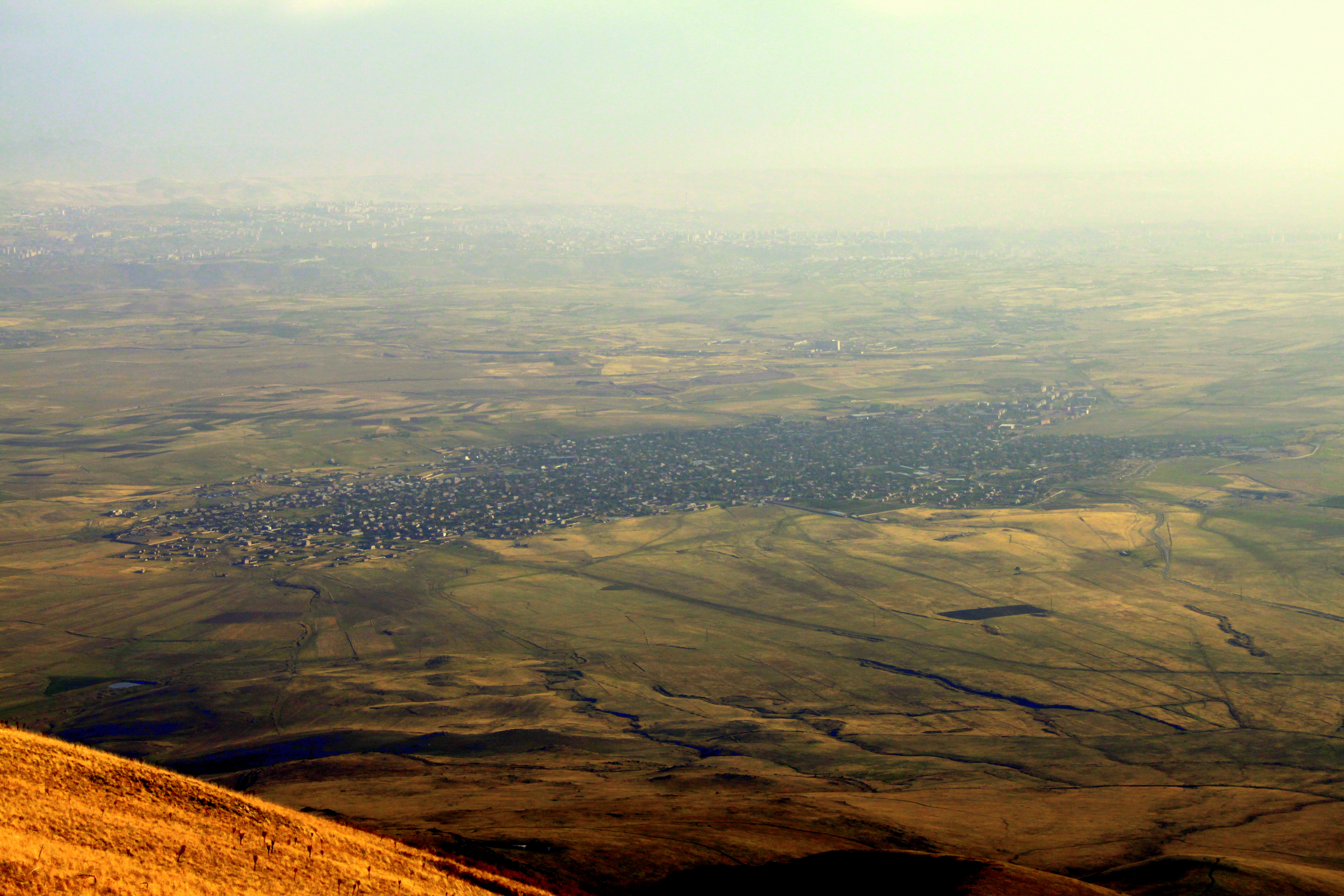
View of Yeghvard from atop Mount Ara

It is located at the west of the central part of modern-day Armenia, 18 km north of the capital Yerevan. Situated at the southern feet of Mount Ara (4.5 km south of the mountain), the town has an average height of 1333 meters above sea level.

=== Climate ===
Climate data for Yeghvard(WMO ID: 37786, normals for 1936-1992)
| Month | Jan | Feb | Mar | Apr | May | Jun | Jul | Aug | Sep | Oct | Nov | Dec | Year |
|---|---|---|---|---|---|---|---|---|---|---|---|---|---|
| Average precipitation mm (inches) | 35.6 (1.40) | 33.4 (1.31) | 38.6 (1.52) | 52.7 (2.07) | 60.0 (2.36) | 35.5 (1.40) | 21.6 (0.85) | 11.8 (0.46) | 15.7 (0.62) | 38.7 (1.52) | 34.5 (1.36) | 35.3 (1.39) | 413.4 (16.26) |
| Average precipitation days (≥ 0.01 in) | 9.2 | 8.4 | 9.3 | 10.3 | 12.4 | 8.1 | 4.2 | 3.1 | 3.6 | 6.8 | 6.2 | 8 | 89.6 |
Source: NCEI

== Demographics ==
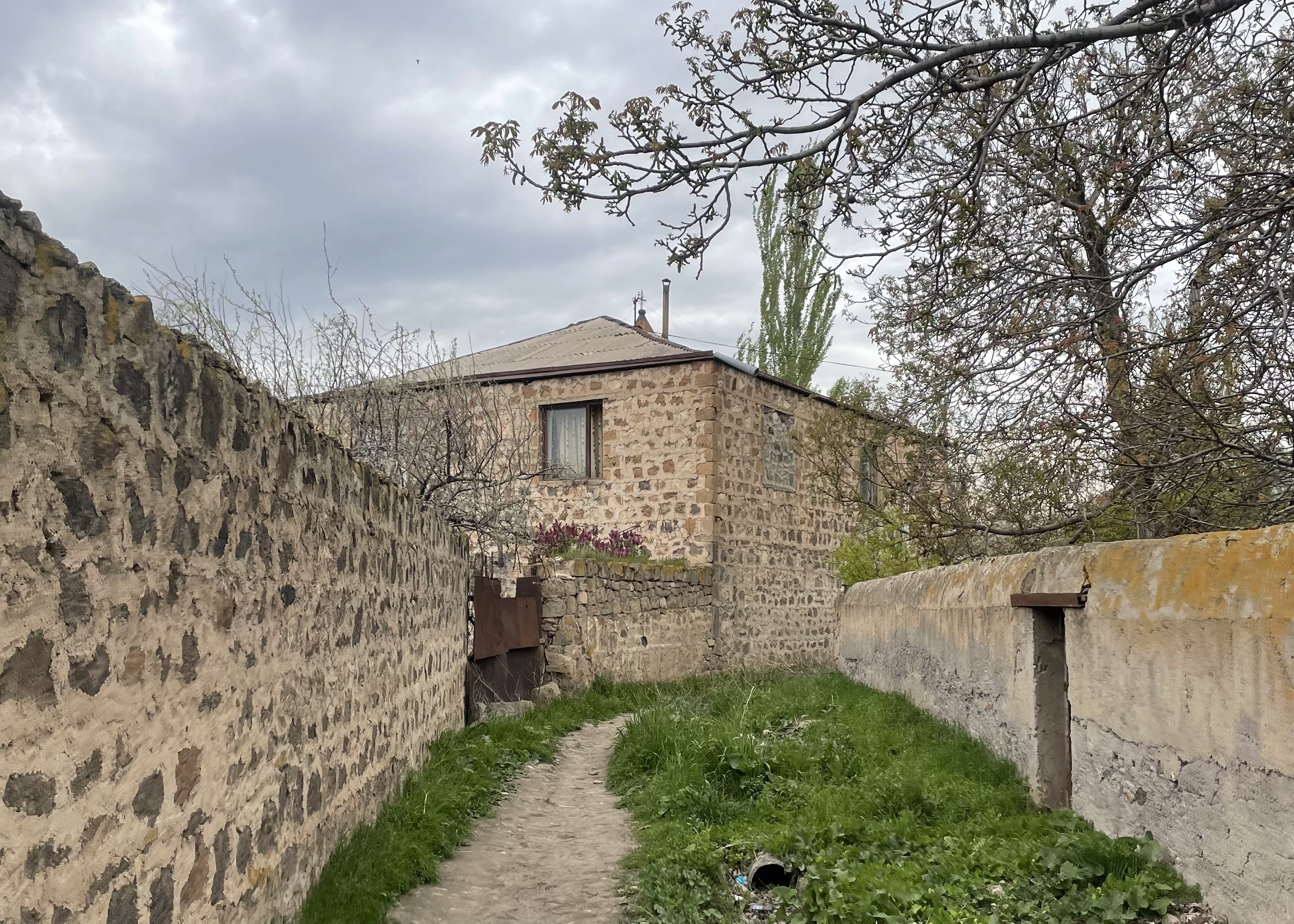
Small alley in Yeghvard

The majority of the population of Yeghvard are ethnic Armenians who belong to the Armenian Apostolic Church, under the jurisdiction of the Diocese of Kotayk. In addition to the town's historic church of the Holy Mother of God, Yeghvard has the Surp Sarkis Church opened in July 2017, with the presence of president Serzh Sargsyan.

Historical population
| Year | Pop. | ±% p.a. |
|---|---|---|
| 1831 | 297 | — |
| 1897 | 2,144 | +3.04% |
| 1926 | 2,865 | +1.00% |
| 1939 | 3,021 | +0.41% |
| 1959 | 3,940 | +1.34% |
| 1970 | 5,398 | +2.90% |
| 1974 | 6,050 | +2.89% |
| 2001 | 11,627 | +2.45% |
| 2011 | 11,672 | +0.04% |
| 2022 | 12,279 | +0.46% |

== Culture ==
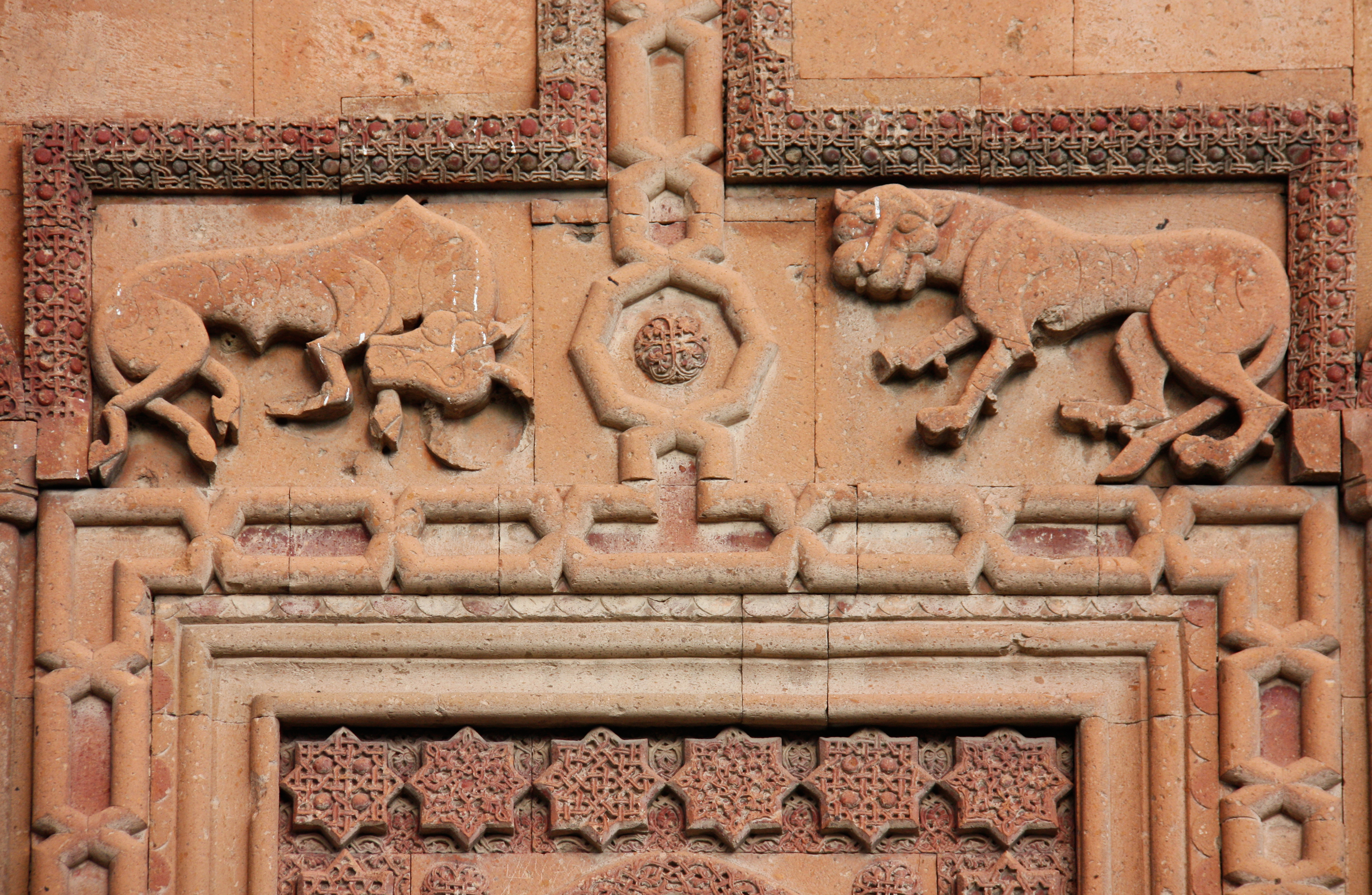
Front details at the Holy Mother of God church

Yeghvard has a house of culture as well as 3 public libraries.

The town has a plenty of historic structures dating back to classical antiquity and the medieval period. The "Seghanasar" ancient settlement located at the southeast of the town is from the 2nd millennium BC. The ruins of a 4th-century church is found in the old cemetery of the town, surrounded with more than 30 khachkars dating back to the 12th century. The ruins of the 5th to 6th-centuries Katoghike Church of Yeghvard are also found at the centre of the town.

However, the Church of the Holy Mother of God of 1301, is the only well-preserved historic structure of the town.

== Transportation ==
Yeghvard is connected with Yerevan through the H4 highway. Th H6 road connect the town with the nearby settlements of Kotayk Province.

== Economy ==
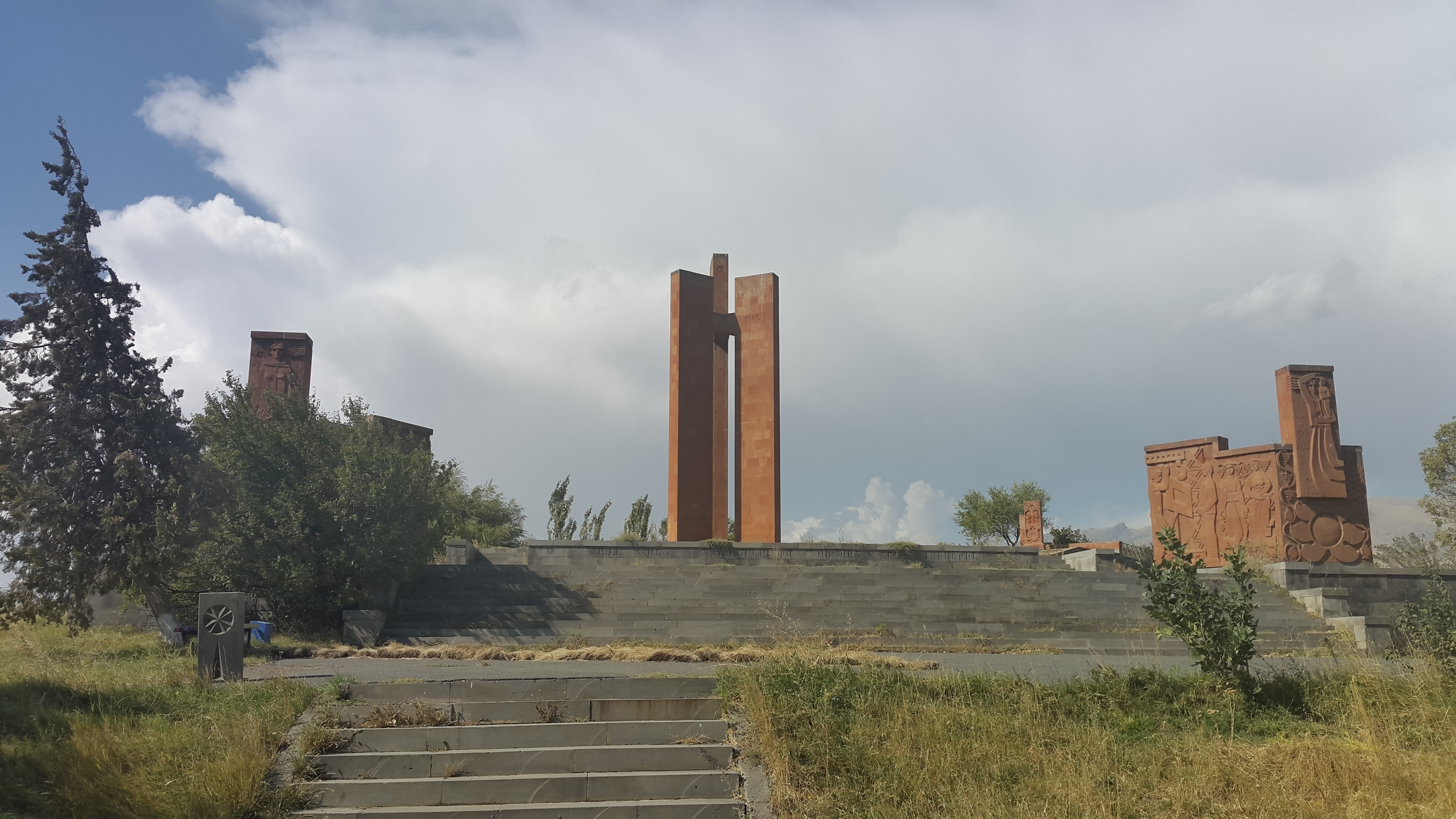
World War II memorial in Yeghvard

Yeghvard has witnessed a major industrial growth during the 1980s under the Soviet rule.

Currently, many major industrial plants including: the Yeghvard wine-brandy factory founded in 1966, the "Nairishin" building materials plant founded in 1986, the Yeghvard sport shoes factory founded in 1987, the Yeghvard yeast plant founded in 1991, the Yeghvard Combined Feed Factory founded in 1993, the "Semur & Co" steel and metal manufacturing plant founded in 2003, and the "Shanazaryan" wine-brandy factory founded in 2005.

In 2016, the "Armoil" company for petroleum has built an oil refinery in Yeghvard.

Yeghvard is also home to the "65 Military Factory" specialized in military products.

The residents of Yeghvard are also involved in agriculture, mainly grape and wheat. The farms are irrigated through the Arzni-Shamiram canal.

The construction of the large Yeghvard reservoir was launched in 1984. It is located to the southwest of the town. However, the construction is not yet completed and it is envisaged to relaunch the project in the near future. It will also include a lakeside resort known as "Masis, Sis and New Armenia".

== Education ==
Yeghvard has 3 public education schools as well as 3 kindergartens. It is also home to 2 art schools and 1 sport school.

The town is served by the Nairi Medical Center.

== Sport ==
FC Yeghvard was a football club that represented the town between 1986 and 1996. However, it was dissolved due to financial difficulties and is no longer active in professional football.

A sports school is operating in the town under the administration of the municipality, with a football stadium and other facilities.

== See also ==
- Gharghavank
- Holy Mother of God Church, Yeghvard
- Battle of Yeghevārd
