= Conizonia aresteni =

Scientific classification
- Kingdom: Animalia
- Phylum: Arthropoda
- Class: Insecta
- Order: Coleoptera
- Suborder: Polyphaga
- Infraorder: Cucujiformia
- Family: Cerambycidae
- Genus: Conizonia
- Species: C. aresteni

Binomial name
- Conizonia aresteni Pic, 1951

Species of beetle

Conizonia aresteni is a species of beetle in the family Cerambycidae. It was described by Maurice Pic in 1951. It is known from Morocco.
