= Conizonia warnieri =

Scientific classification
- Kingdom: Animalia
- Phylum: Arthropoda
- Class: Insecta
- Order: Coleoptera
- Suborder: Polyphaga
- Infraorder: Cucujiformia
- Family: Cerambycidae
- Genus: Conizonia
- Species: C. warnieri

Binomial name
- Conizonia warnieri (H. Lucas, 1849)

Synonyms
- Conizonia aumontiana (H. Lucas) Aurivillius, 1921; Conizonia aumontiana var. inlateralis Pic, 1942; Conizonia aumontiana var. poweli Pic, 1941; Conizonia aumontiana var. pygidialis Pic, 1911; Conizonia bicoloricornis Pic, 1942; Conizonia henoni Pic, 1891; Conizonia heterogyna Fairmaire, 1870; Conizonia mimeuri Pic, 1950; Conizonia poweli (Pic) Villiers, 1946; Phytoecia aumontiana H. Lucas, 1851

Species of beetle

Conizonia warnieri is a species of beetle in the family Cerambycidae. It was described by Hippolyte Lucas in 1849. It is known from Tunisia and Algeria.

== Varieties ==
- Conizonia warnieri var. brunnea Breuning, 1954
- Conizonia warnieri var. cocquerelii Fairmaire, 1873
- Conizonia warnieri var. ruficornis Breuning, 1954
- Conizonia warnieri var. vittithorax Pic, 1900
