= Zoravan =

Zoravan Զորավան
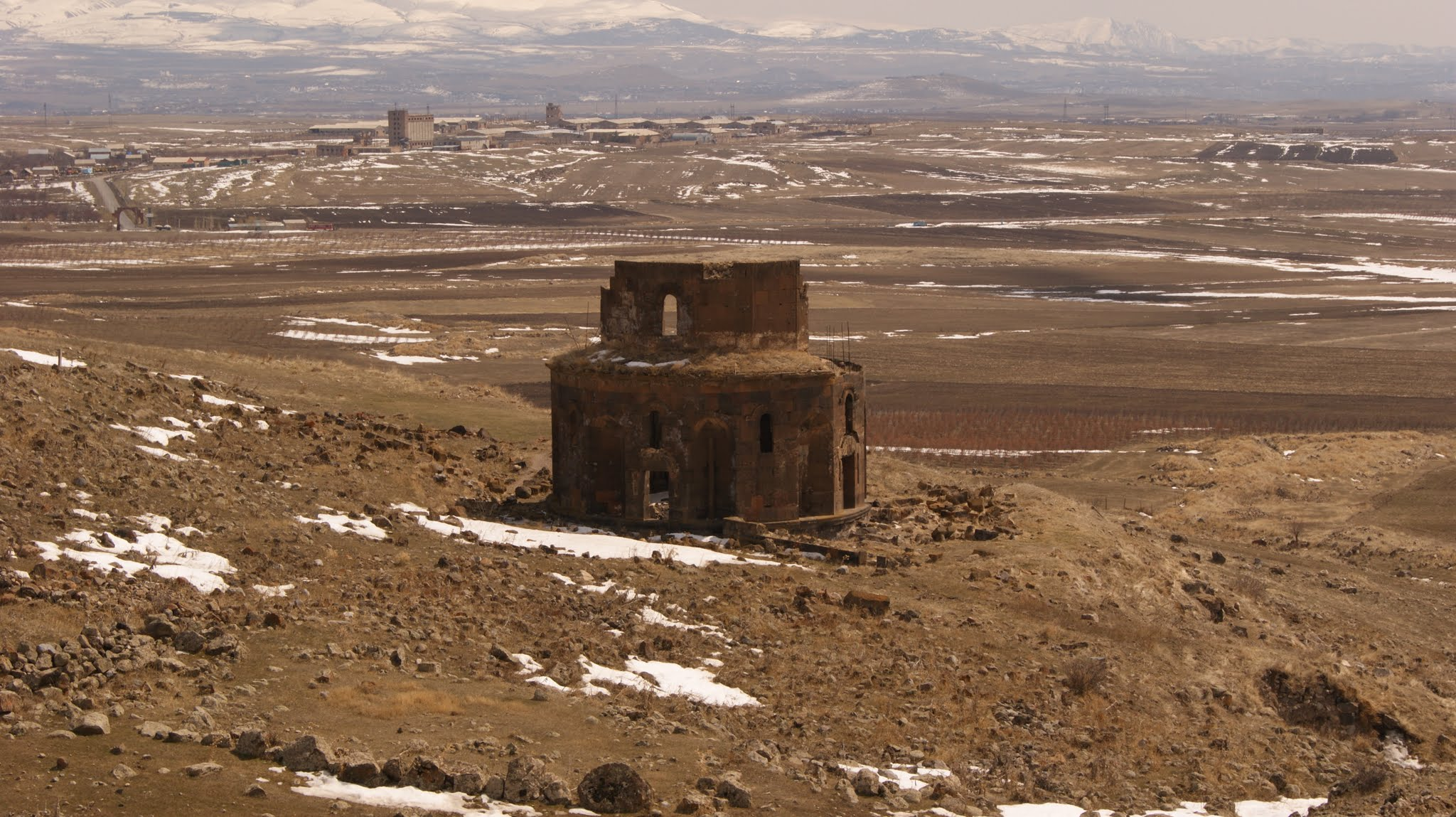
- Gharghavank Zoravor Church (foreground) and the village of Zoravan (background)

- Location within Armenia
- Coordinates: 40°21′25″N 44°31′23″E
- Country: Armenia
- Marz (Province): Kotayk
- Re-founded: 1972-80

Government
  - Mayor: Baghdasar Tovmasyan
- Elevation: 1,380 m (4,530 ft)

Population (2011)
  - Total: 1,241
- Time zone: UTC+4

Zoravan (Armenian: Զորավան; formerly, Ghargavank and Pokravan; historically and prior to 1972–80, Khacho) is a village situated along the lower slopes of Mount Ara in the Kotayk Province of Armenia. The village was established in 1972–80, during which time it was called Pokravan, for the purpose of developing a large stockyard or feedlot that would ultimately be utilized to breed a target of eleven-thousand animals. After reaching capacity, the village was renamed to Zoravan after the nearby Zoravar Church, also known as Gharghavank, built between 661 and 685 by Prince Grigor Mamikonian. The community currently has a school and a kindergarten. Drinking water for the village comes from a source near Karenis, while water for irrigation comes from Lake Sevan.

== Gallery ==
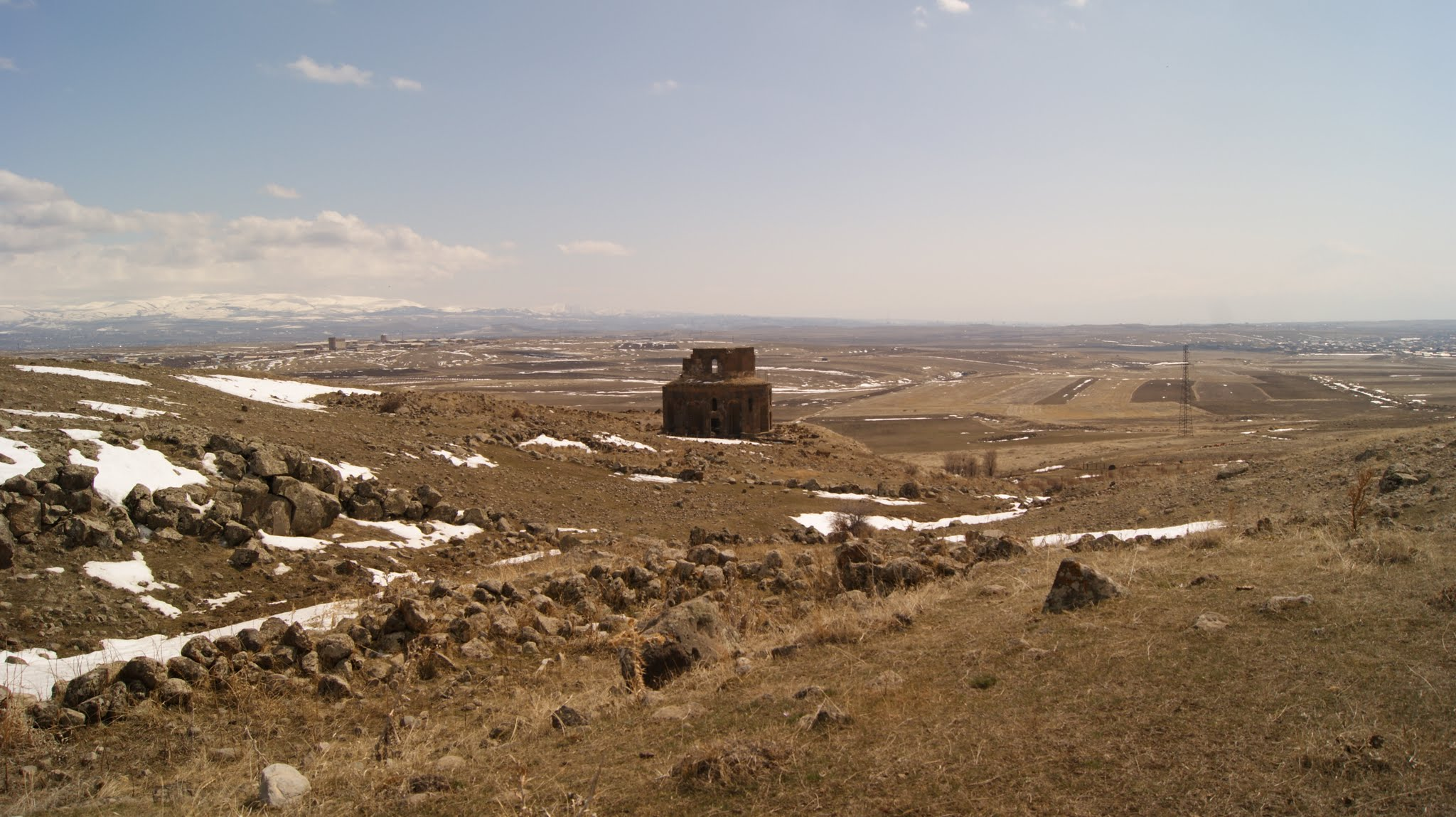
Gharghavank in relation to the villages of Zoravan (left) and Yeghvard (right)

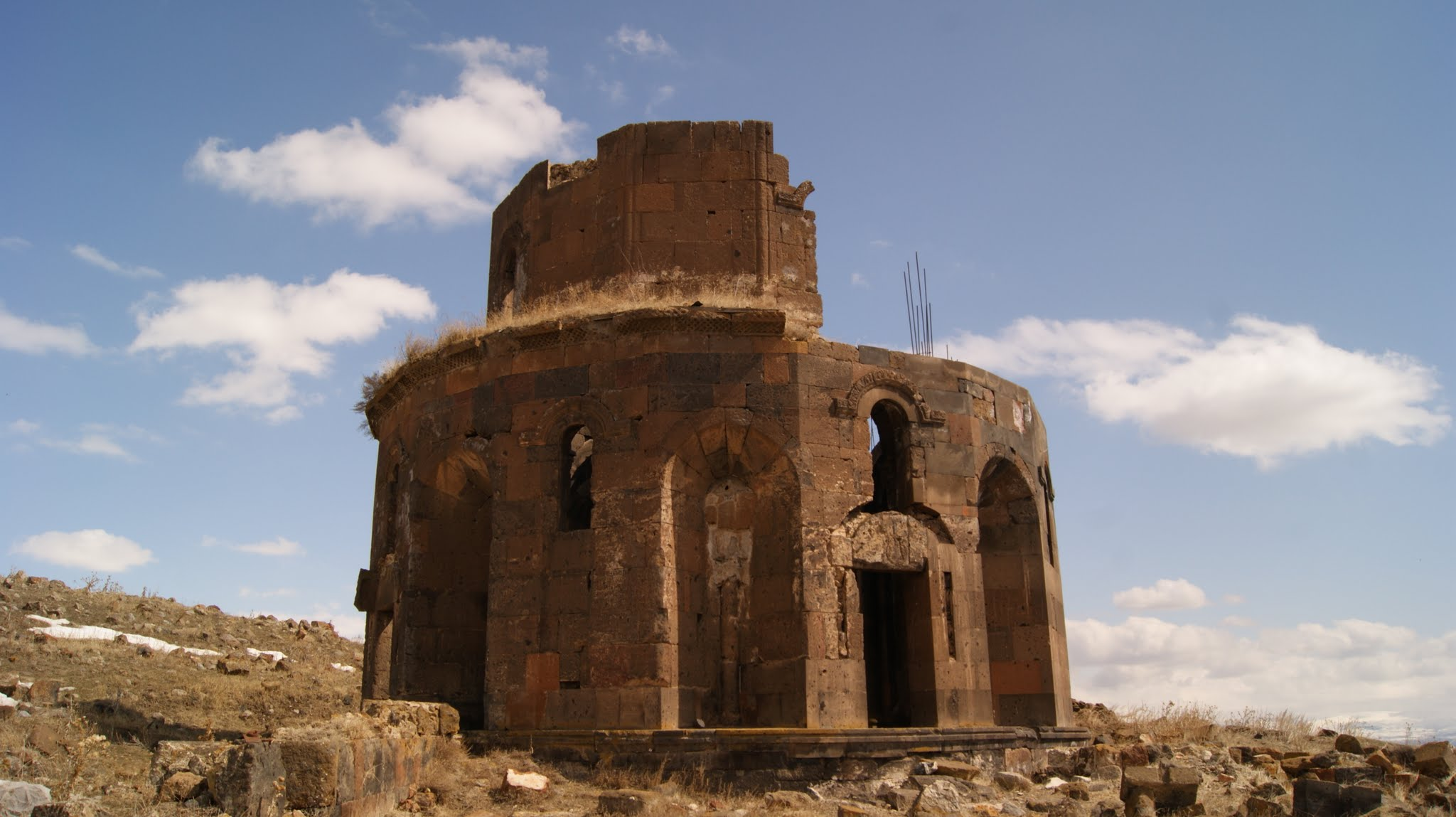
Gharghavank, 7th c.

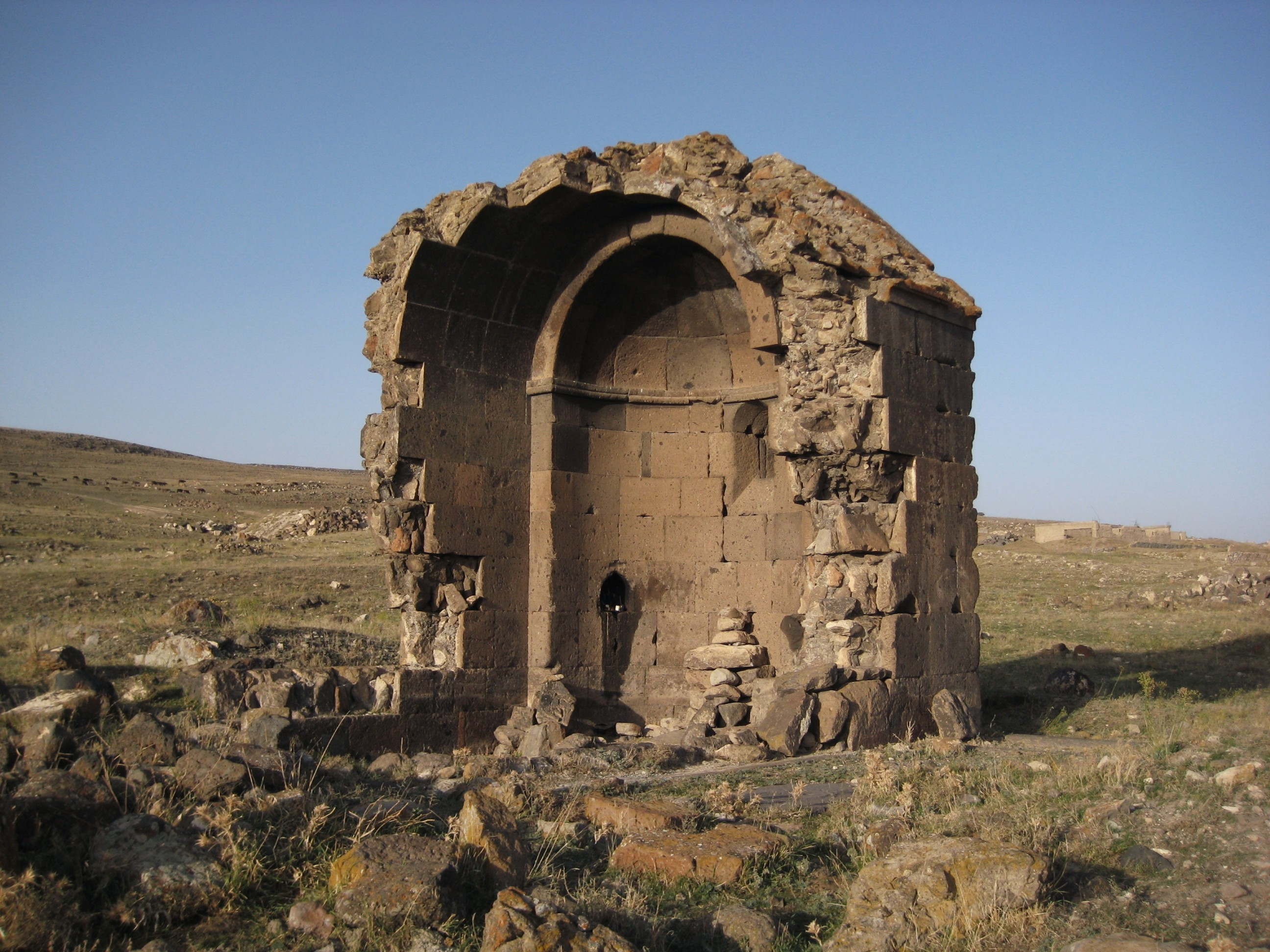
Funeral chapel adjacent to the church

== See also ==
- Kotayk Province
