= Conizonia fausti =

Scientific classification
- Kingdom: Animalia
- Phylum: Arthropoda
- Class: Insecta
- Order: Coleoptera
- Suborder: Polyphaga
- Infraorder: Cucujiformia
- Family: Cerambycidae
- Genus: Conizonia
- Species: C. fausti

Binomial name
- Conizonia fausti (Ganglbauer, 1885)

Synonyms
- Coptosia fausti (Ganglbauer, 1885); Iranocoptosia balachowskyi Villiers, 1967; Iranocoptosia fausti (Ganglbauer, 1885); Phytoecia (Coptosia) fausti Ganglbauer, 1885

Species of beetle

Conizonia fausti is a species of beetle in the family Cerambycidae. It was described by Ganglbauer in 1885, originally under the genus Phytoecia. It is known from Iran.
