= Conizonia albolineata =

Scientific classification
- Kingdom: Animalia
- Phylum: Arthropoda
- Clade: Pancrustacea
- Class: Insecta
- Order: Coleoptera
- Suborder: Polyphaga
- Infraorder: Cucujiformia
- Family: Cerambycidae
- Genus: Conizonia
- Species: C. albolineata

Binomial name
- Conizonia albolineata (Hampe, 1852)

Synonyms
- Phytoecia (Pteromallosia) albolineata (Hampe) Plavilstshikov, 1926; Pteromallosia albolineata (Hampe) Pic, 1900; Phytoecia albolineata Hampe, 1852

Species of beetle

Conizonia albolineata is a species of beetle in the family Cerambycidae. It was described by Hampe in 1852, originally under the genus Phytoecia. It is known from Iran, Armenia, and Turkey. It contains the varietas Conizonia albolineata var. fulvolineata.
