= Conizonia bodoani =

Scientific classification
- Kingdom: Animalia
- Phylum: Arthropoda
- Class: Insecta
- Order: Coleoptera
- Suborder: Polyphaga
- Infraorder: Cucujiformia
- Family: Cerambycidae
- Genus: Conizonia
- Species: C. bodoani

Binomial name
- Conizonia bodoani (Pic, 1912)

Synonyms
- Eurycoptosia bodoani (Pic, 1912); Phytoecia (Coptosia) bodoani Pic, 1912

Species of beetle

Conizonia bodoani is a species of beetle in the family Cerambycidae. It was described by Maurice Pic in 1912, originally under the genus Phytoecia. It is known from Azerbaijan, Turkey and Iran.
