= Conizonia detrita =

Scientific classification
- Kingdom: Animalia
- Phylum: Arthropoda
- Class: Insecta
- Order: Coleoptera
- Suborder: Polyphaga
- Infraorder: Cucujiformia
- Family: Cerambycidae
- Genus: Conizonia
- Species: C. detrita

Binomial name
- Conizonia detrita (Fabricius, 1793)

Synonyms
- Conizonia vittigera (Fabricius) Fairmaire, 1864; Phytoecia (Conizonia) detrita (Fabricius) Ganglbauer, 1883; Phytoecia vittigera (Fabricius) Küster, 1846; Saperda detrita Fabricius, 1793; Saperda vittigera Fabricius, 1801

Species of beetle

Conizonia detrita is a species of beetle in the family Cerambycidae. It was described by Johan Christian Fabricius in 1793, originally under the genus Saperda. It is known from Morocco, Algeria, and Tunisia. It feeds on Scolymus hispanicus. It contains the varietas Conizonia detrita var. maculosa.
