= Kuys Varvara =

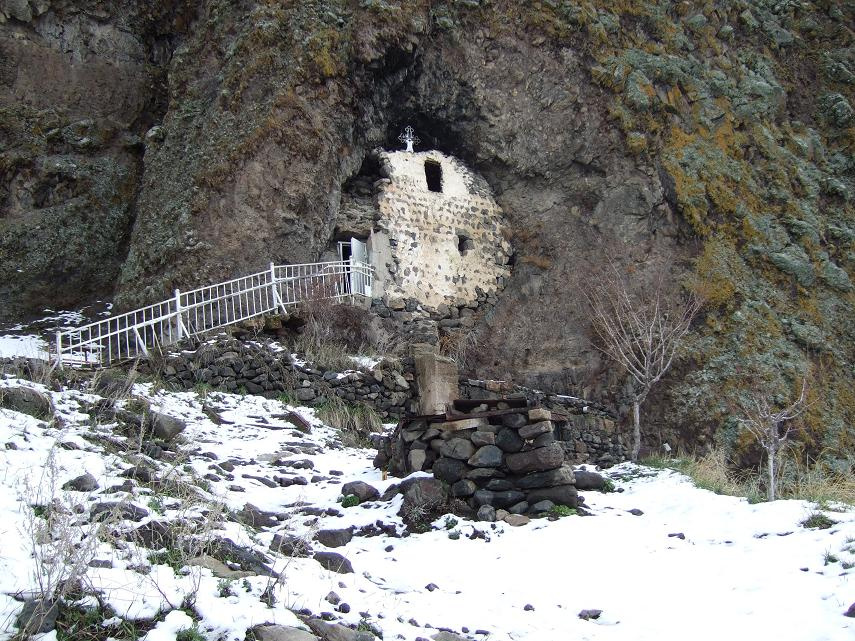
Kuys Varvara (Virgin Barbara) cave, also known as Tsaghkevank (Flower Monastery), at Mount Ara, Armenia

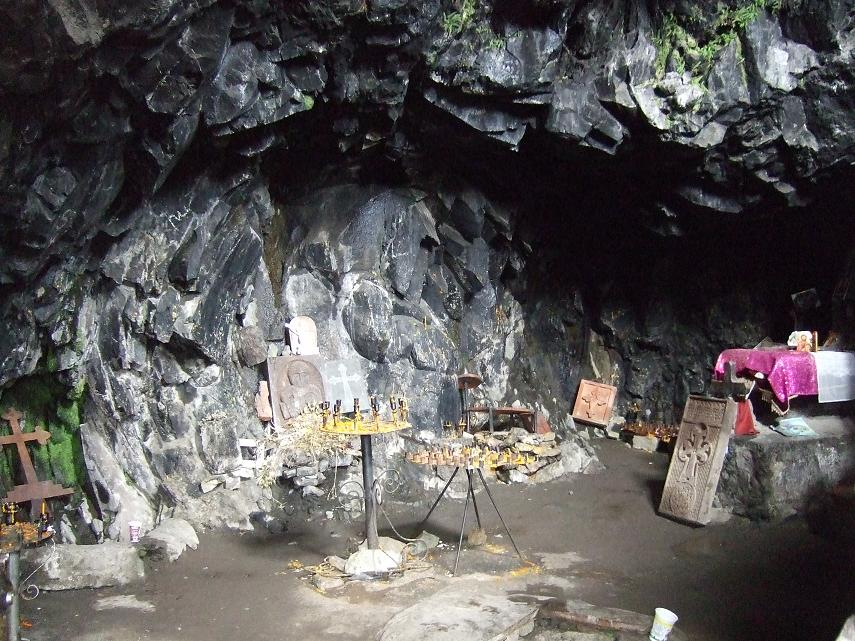
Inside the cave

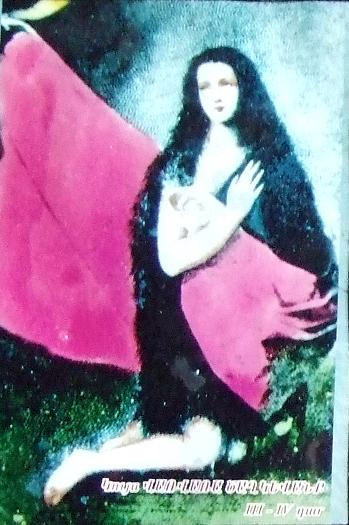
Depiction of Kuys Varvara

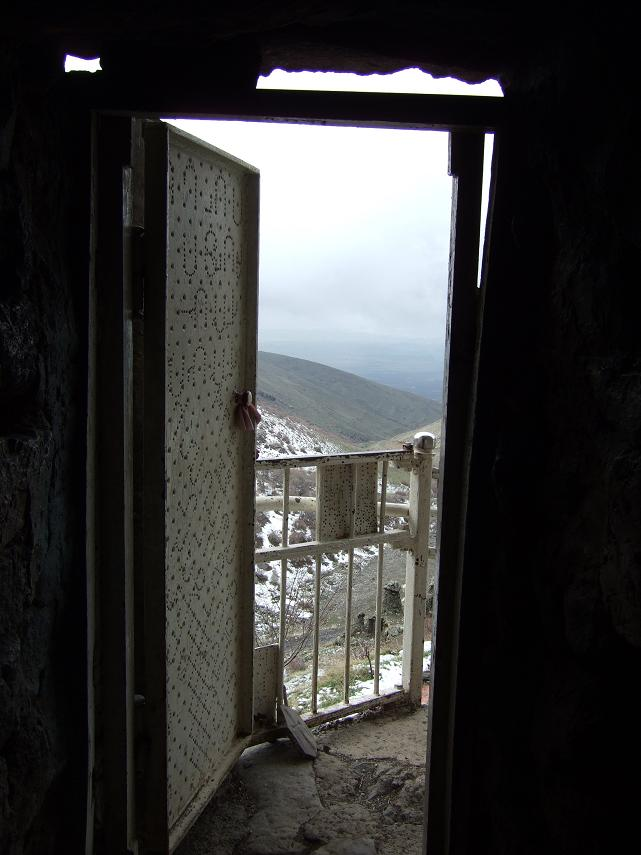
View out the cave door

Kuys Varvara (the Virgin Barbara) is a revered religious figure in parts of Armenia, and the Tsaghkavank (Flower Monastery) is a cave shrine devoted to her on the southern slopes of Mount Ara. The mossy cave is reported to contain a spring, held as sacred by some believers. An altar, ferns, and candle vendors are also around the shrine. Legend holds that Saint Barbara was martyred by her cruel father for espousing Christianity. She is one of the saints of the Armenian Apostolic Church.
