= Conizonia allardi =

Scientific classification
- Kingdom: Animalia
- Phylum: Arthropoda
- Class: Insecta
- Order: Coleoptera
- Suborder: Polyphaga
- Infraorder: Cucujiformia
- Family: Cerambycidae
- Genus: Conizonia
- Species: C. allardi

Binomial name
- Conizonia allardi Fairmaire, 1866

Synonyms
- Conizonia elegantula Fairmaire, 1870

Species of beetle

Conizonia allardi is a species of beetle in the family Cerambycidae. It was described by Léon Fairmaire in 1866. It is known from Tunisia, Algeria, and Morocco. It feeds on Centaurea pullata.

== Subspecies ==
- Conizonia allardi allardi Fairmaire, 1866
- Conizonia allardi guyi Sama, 2005
