= Gharghavank =

Armenian temple from VII century

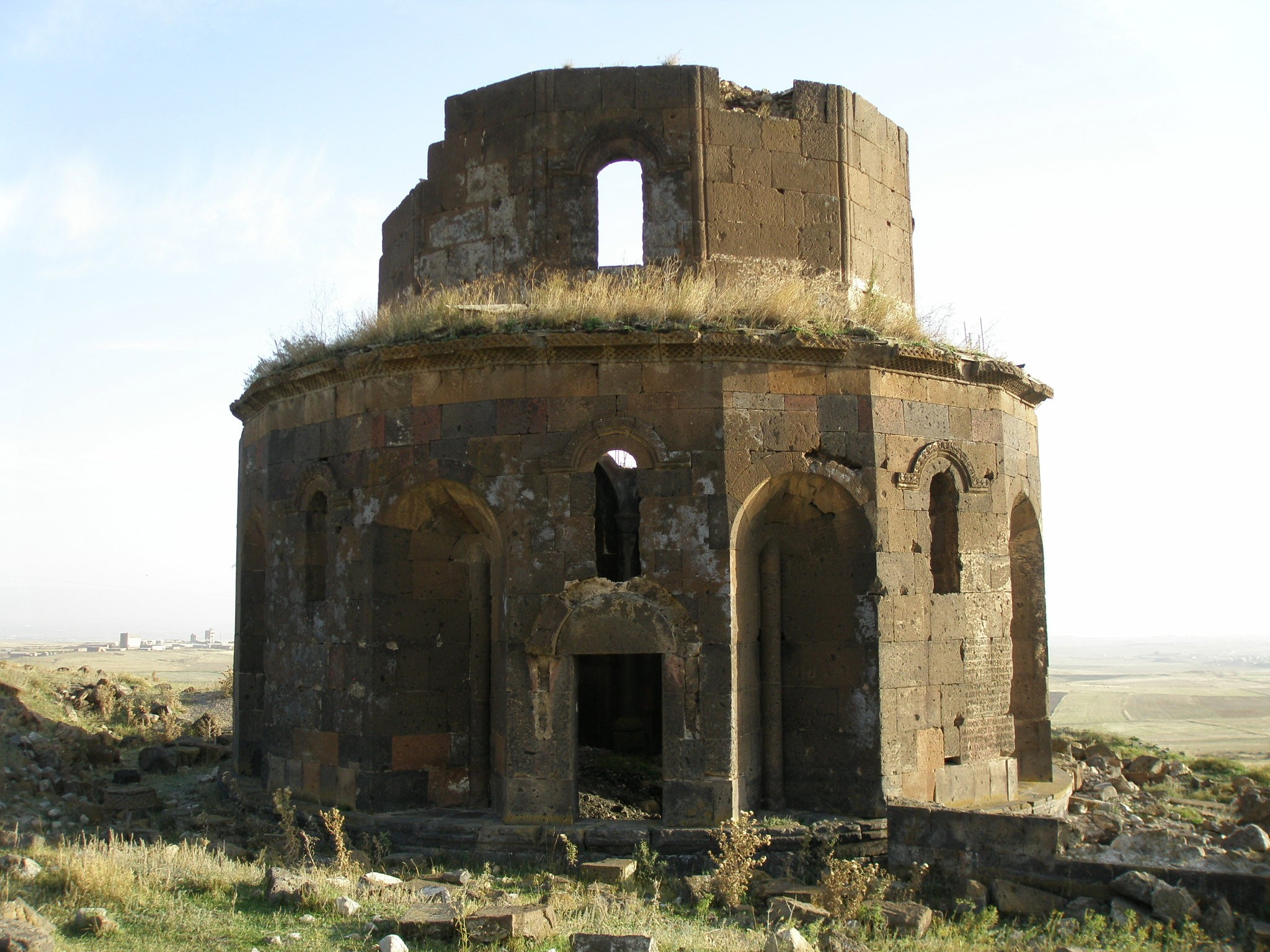
- The ruins of Gharghavank on the hillside.

- Location within Armenia

Religion
- Affiliation: Armenian Apostolic Church

Location
- Location: Zoravan, Kotayk Province, Armenia
- Coordinates: 40.3628°N 44.50651°E

Architecture
- Type: Central-plan aisled tetra-conch (Circular)
- Style: Armenian
- Completed: Between 661 and 685
- Dome: 1 cupola (collapsed)

Gharghavank (also, Zoravor Church, Armenian: Զորավոր եկեղեցի) is a ruined Armenian Apostolic church located on the outskirts of the village of Zoravan, at the lower slopes of Mount Ara in Kotayk Province, Armenia. To get to the church, turn left immediately after the small cemetery before reaching the village and go up the dirt road that follows closely next to the cemetery grounds. At the fork, keep following left up past the cemetery along a poorly maintained dirt road. After traveling some distance, the church will be perched upon the hillside to the right. Gharghavank may actually be seen from the main highway in the distance, but is hardly distinguishable from the other ruins of more modern structures scattered nearby. A short walk up the hill leads to the church and an ancient cemetery a little further up the hill.

== Architecture ==
=== Zoravor Church ===
According to the Armenian historian Vardan Areveltsi of the 13th century, Gharghavank was built between the years 661 and 685 by Prince Grigor Mamikonian. The church is a centrally planned aisled tetraconch type with eight semicircular apses radiating from the interior octagonal space. Exteriors of the eight apse walls alternate with eight rectilinear panels containing wide triangular niches which divide each of the apses. The thick apse walls and pendentives supported a drum and cupola above. Most of the drum and the cupola have since collapsed. Fragments of the geometric decoration may be seen around the premises.

There are two portals that lead into the structure. On the semi-circular lintel of one, is carved a cruciform khachkar design. In the corners of the triangular niches on the exterior, are columnar decorations. Other designs may be seen around the saddles above the windows, the eaves and cornices, and decorative features that were once around the portals. Foliage relief may be seen around the windows, while geometric relief is along the eaves and cornices. There are also traces of painted relief on the interior of the church. Decorative relief found on the church resembles that at the 7th century Church of Zvartnots at Etchmiadzin.

Restoration work was done to the north side of the church in 1948 and again in later years. Relatively recent photographs show only approximately half of the original structure intact, where the collapsed portion of the wall stands rebuilt today. Some rebar may be seen along the section of the upper wall where the drum once stood, hinting at prior intentions to rebuild portions of the drum as well.

=== Funeral chapel and cemetery ===
A short distance from the church are the remains of another structure that served as a funeral chapel. Only a semicircular apse remains standing with some of the roofing still intact. A sundial style design is subtly embedded in the interior portion above the apse at the apex of the half-dome, and a single window peers out below. A cemetery is located nearby, with a few khachkars that remain preserved. Many only have a base stone where they once stood.

== Gallery ==
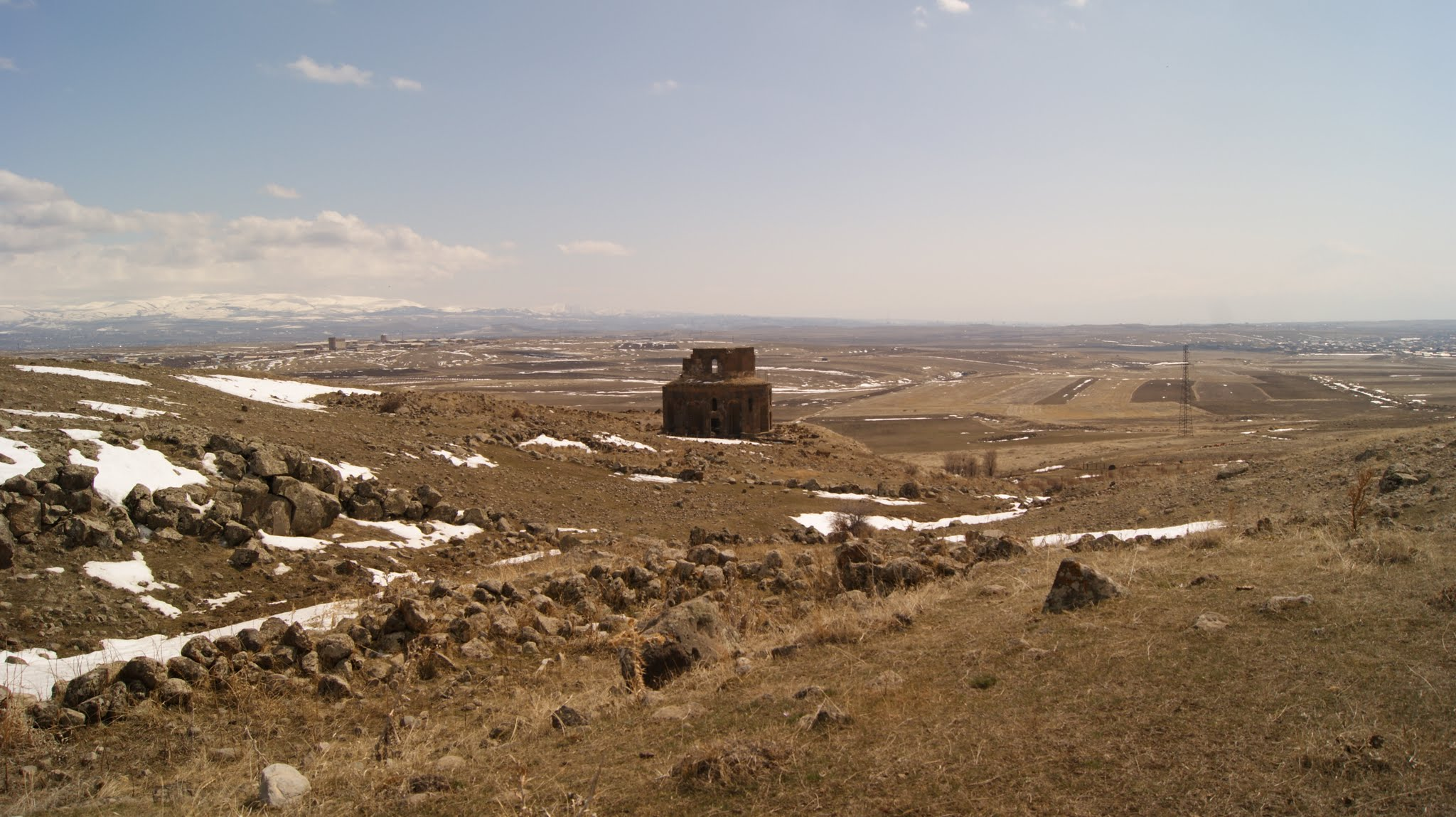
Gharghavank in relation to the villages of Zoravan (left) and Yeghvard (right)

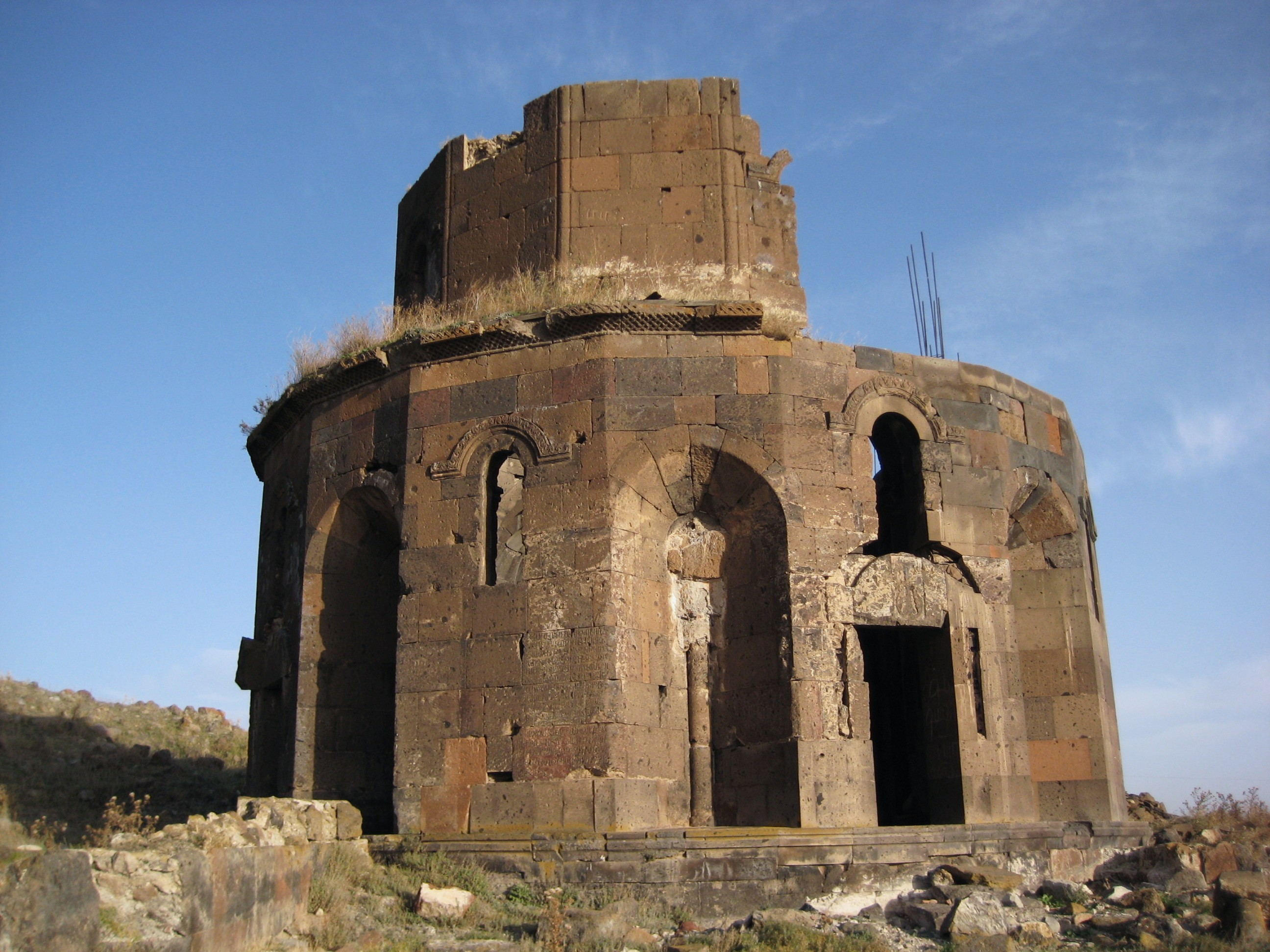
Another view of the church

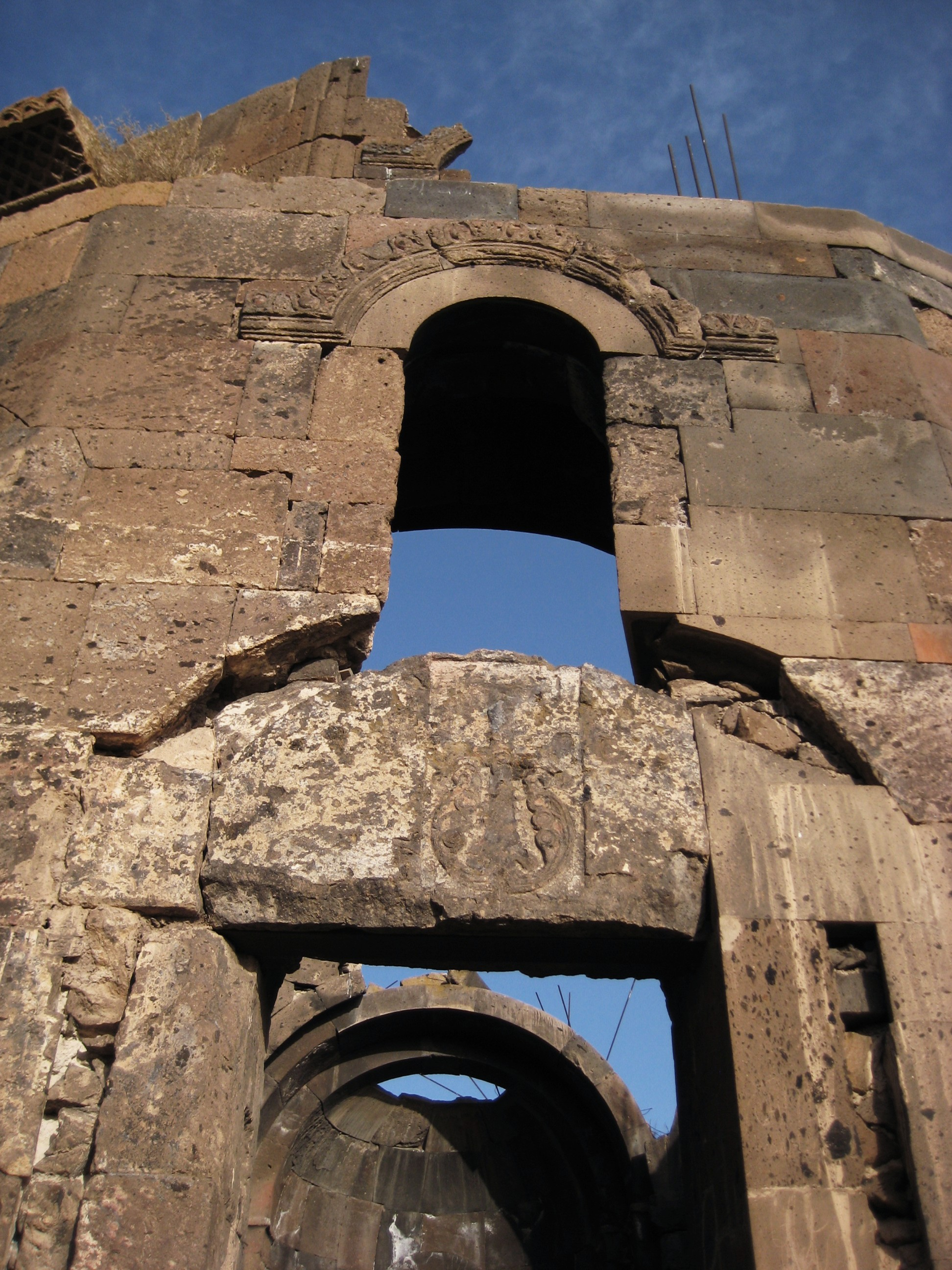
A khachkar design on the lintel of one of the entries.

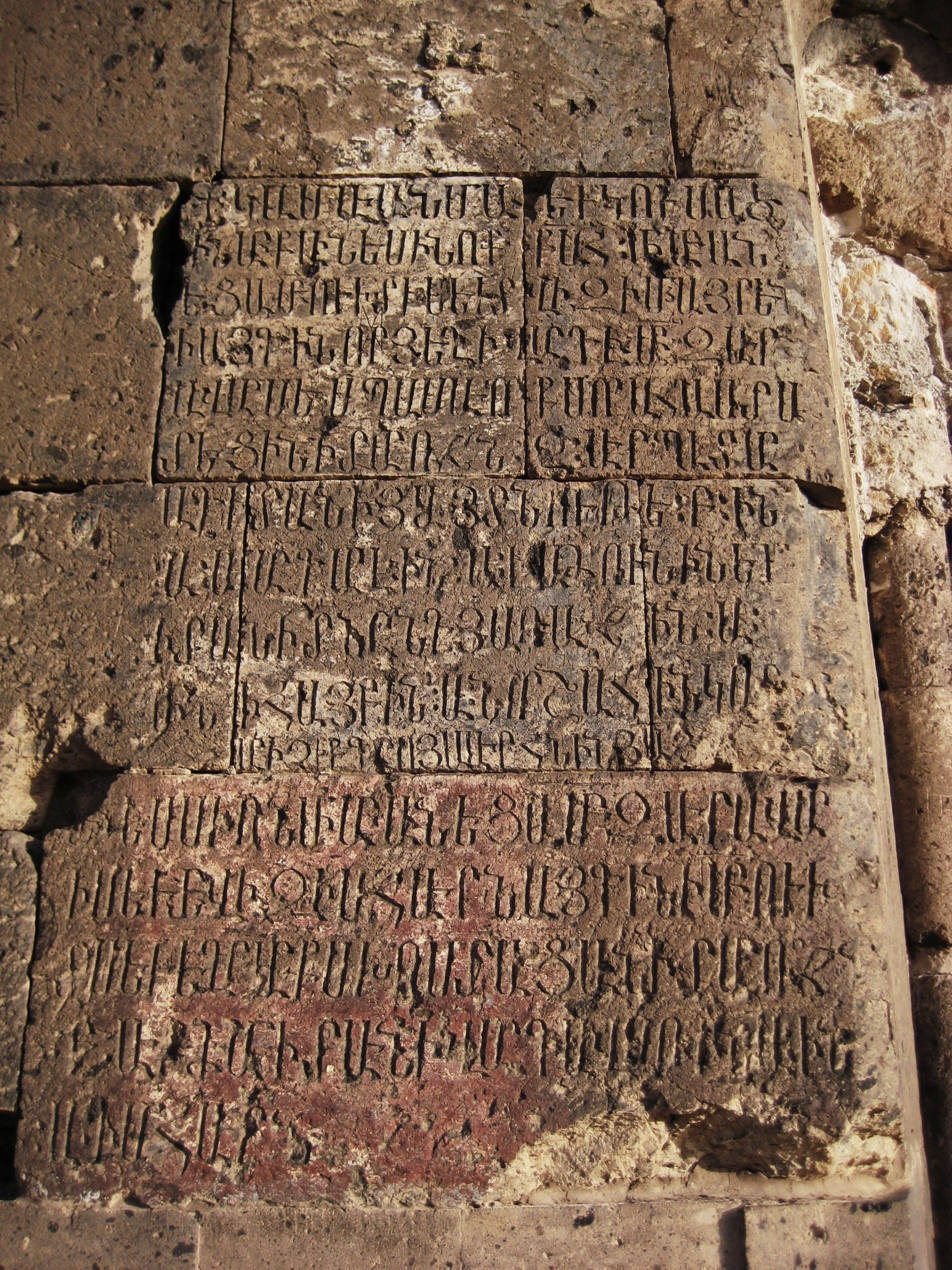
An inscription on the exterior wall near the main entry. Note the stonemasons mark on the fourth line down.

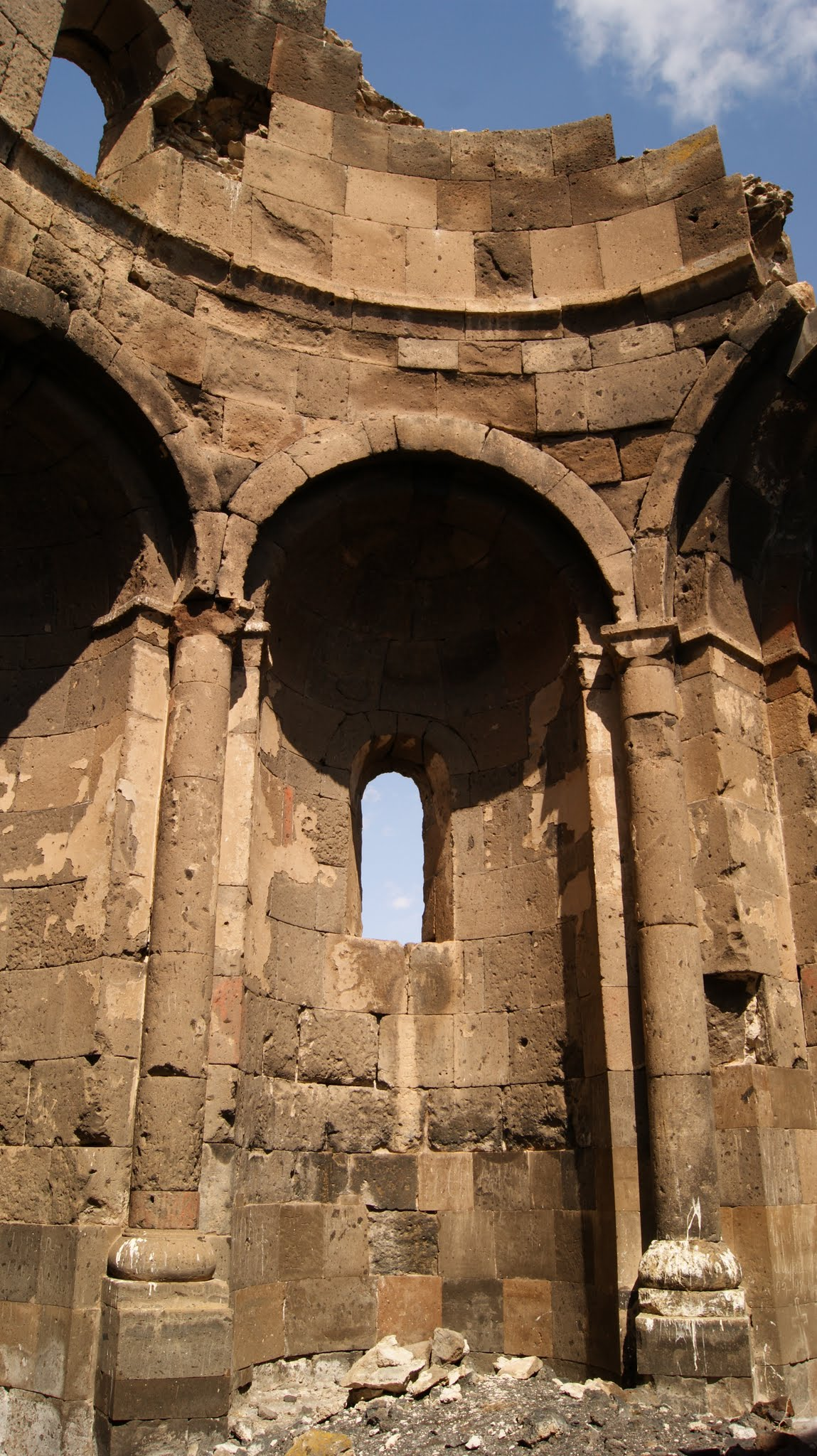
The church interior showing apses and columnar supports

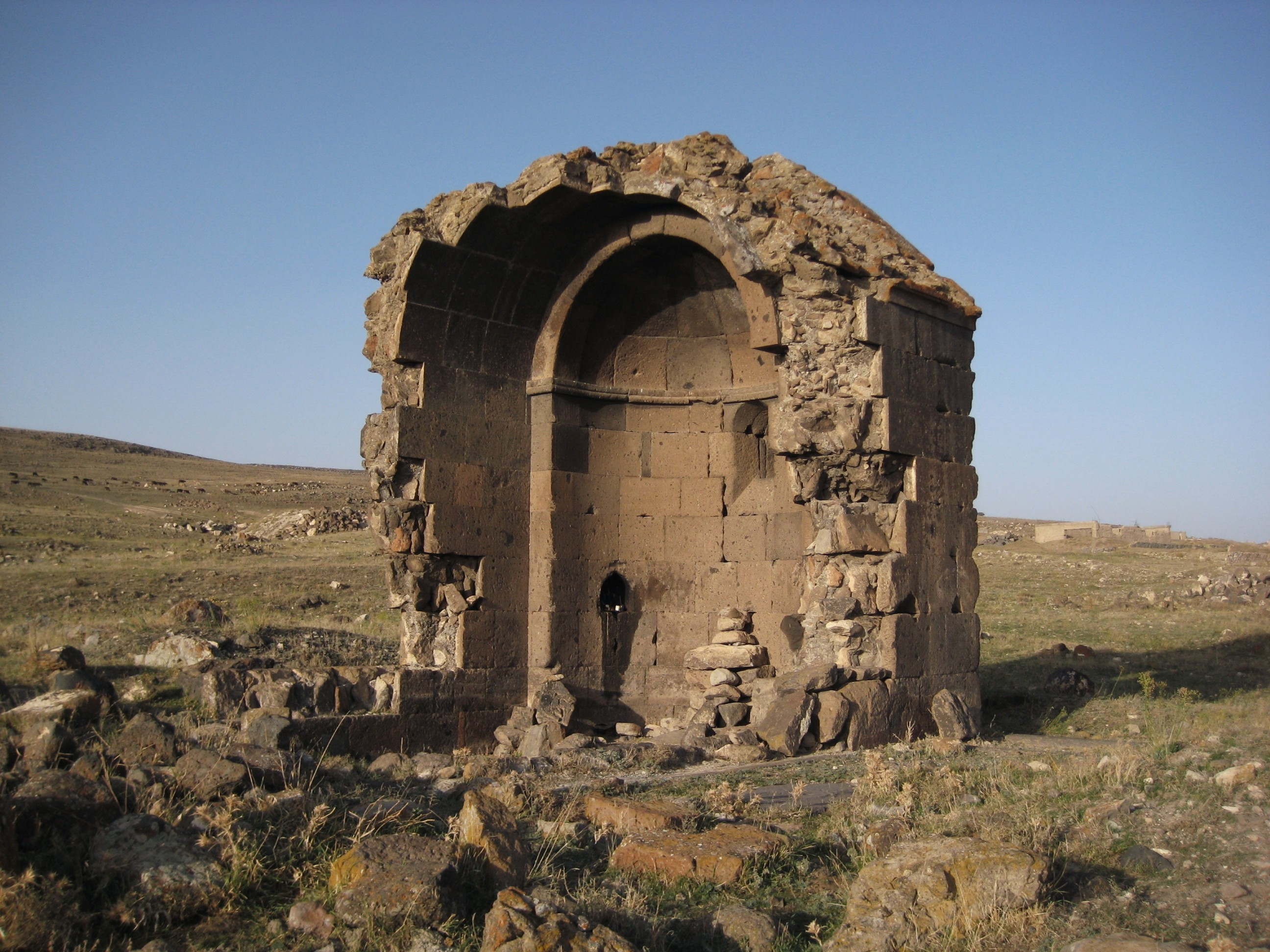
Funeral Chapel adjacent to the church

== See also ==
- Banak Cathedral
- Zvartnots Cathedral
