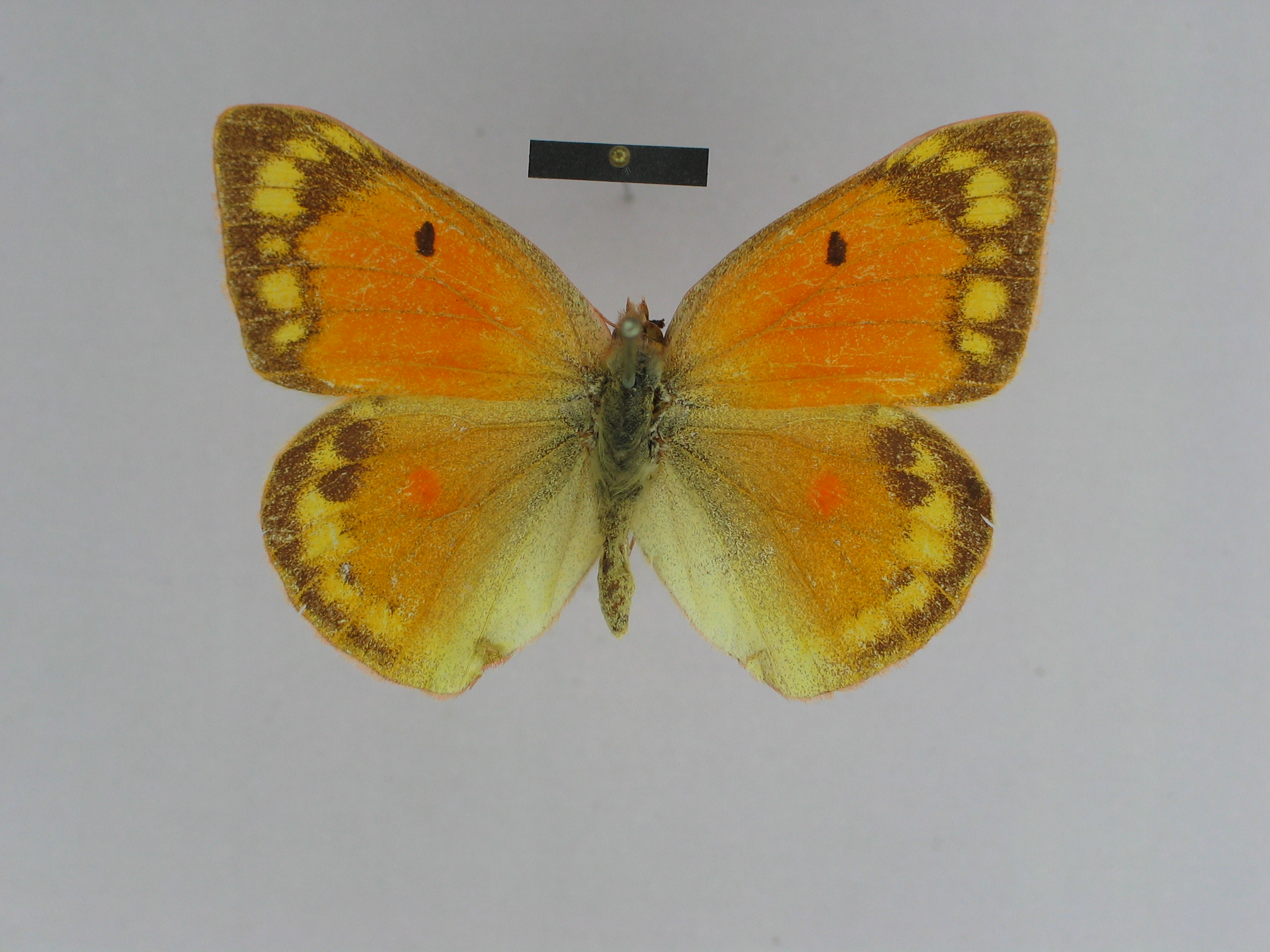
- Colias aurorina spp. transcaspica female dorsal side

Scientific classification
- Kingdom: Animalia
- Phylum: Arthropoda
- Class: Insecta
- Order: Lepidoptera
- Family: Pieridae
- Genus: Colias
- Species: C. aurorina

Binomial name
- Colias aurorina Herrich-Schäffer, 1850

= Colias aurorina =

Species of butterfly

Colias aurorina, the Greek clouded butterfly or dawn clouded yellow, is a butterfly in the family Pieridae. It is found in Greece, the Near East, the Caucasus, and in Iran and Turkmenistan.

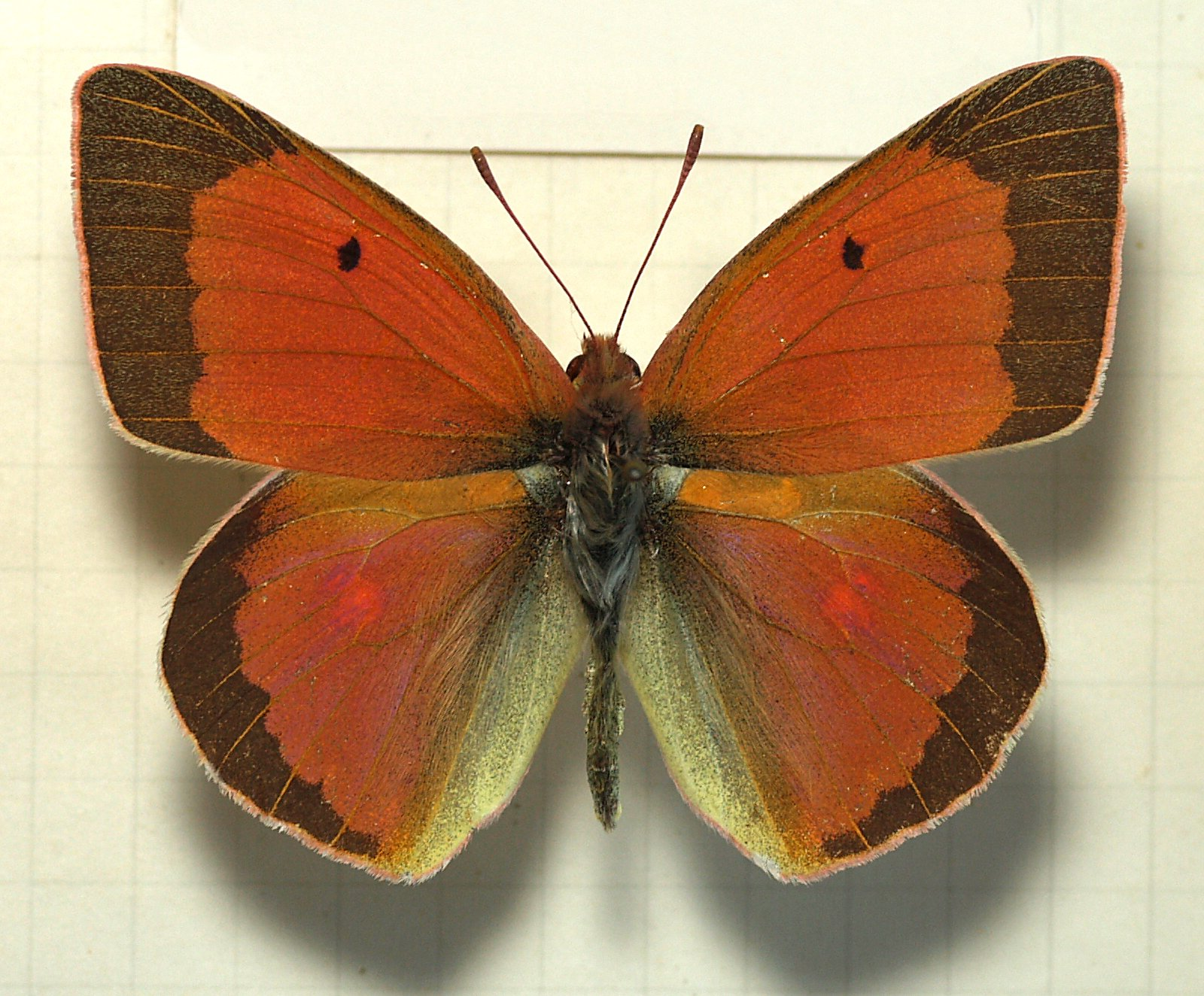
Colias aurorina spp. heldreichi

== Description ==
Colias aurorina is one of the largest species of the genus; the wingspan is 35–70 mm. The upperside of the male is dusky orange-yellow, with moderately broad blackish brown marginal band which is traversed at the apex by yellow veins, the rather large middle spot of the forewing being blackish brown and that of the hindwing large and orange-red. The ground-colour of the female is somewhat brighter red, the dark marginal band bearing large yellow spots, which on the hindwing form a proximally dark-edged band, the dark marginal band being obsolescent.

== Biology ==
The butterfly flies from May to July.

The larvae feed on Astracantha and Astragalus species.

== Subspecies ==
There are a number of subspecies:

- C. a. aurorina – Armenia, Georgia, Azerbaijan, Talysh, N. Iran, Turkey
- C. a. libanotica Lederer, 1858 – Israel, Lebanon, Turkey
- C. a. heldreichi Staudinger, 1862 – Greece
- C. a. anna Gerhard, 1882 – Daghestan, Armenia
- C. a. transcaspica Christoph, 1889 – Turkmenistan (Kopet-Dagh, W. Transcaspia)
- C. a. taurica Rebel, 1901 – Turkey
- C. a. rosei Gross & Ebert, 1975 – N. Iran (Elburs)
- C. a. kermana Eckweiler, 1979 – Iran (Kerman)
- C. l. sovarensis Blom, 1979 – Iran
- C. a. lauta Morgun, 2010 – Russian Caucasus (Elburs)
