= Dorcadion kasikoporanum =

Scientific classification
- Kingdom: Animalia
- Phylum: Arthropoda
- Clade: Pancrustacea
- Class: Insecta
- Order: Coleoptera
- Suborder: Polyphaga
- Infraorder: Cucujiformia
- Family: Cerambycidae
- Genus: Dorcadion
- Species: D. kasikoporanum

Binomial name
- Dorcadion kasikoporanum Pic, 1902

Species of beetle

Dorcadion kasikoporanum is a species of beetle in the family Cerambycidae. It was described by Maurice Pic in 1902.
