= Conizonia =

Scientific classification
- Domain: Eukaryota
- Kingdom: Animalia
- Phylum: Arthropoda
- Class: Insecta
- Order: Coleoptera
- Suborder: Polyphaga
- Infraorder: Cucujiformia
- Family: Cerambycidae
- Subfamily: Lamiinae
- Genus: Conizonia; Fairmaire, 1868

Genus of beetles

Conizonia is a genus of longhorn beetles of the subfamily Lamiinae, containing the following species:

subgenus Conizonia

- Conizonia allardi Fairmaire, 1866
- Conizonia aresteni Pic, 1951
- Conizonia detrita (Fabricius, 1793)
- Conizonia guerinii (Breme, 1840)
- Conizonia kubani Holzschuh, 1991
- Conizonia mounai Sama, 2005
- Conizonia simia Sama, 2005
- Conizonia warnieri (Lucas, 1849)

subgenus Conizonioides

- Conizonia kalashiani Danilevsky, 1992

subgenus Eurycoptosia

- Conizonia bodoani (Pic, 1912)

subgenus Iranocoptosia

- Conizonia fausti (Ganglbauer, 1885)

subgenus Pteromallosia

- Conizonia albolineata (Hampe, 1852)
- Conizonia anularis Holzschuh, 1984
