= Conizonia kalashiani =

Scientific classification
- Kingdom: Animalia
- Phylum: Arthropoda
- Class: Insecta
- Order: Coleoptera
- Suborder: Polyphaga
- Infraorder: Cucujiformia
- Family: Cerambycidae
- Genus: Conizonia
- Species: C. kalashiani

Binomial name
- Conizonia kalashiani Danilevsky, 1992

Species of beetle

Conizonia kalashiani is a species of beetle in the family Cerambycidae. It was described by Mikhail Leontievich Danilevsky in 1992. It is known from Georgia.
