= Coptosia kubani =

Scientific classification
- Kingdom: Animalia
- Phylum: Arthropoda
- Class: Insecta
- Order: Coleoptera
- Family: Cerambycidae
- Genus: Coptosia
- Species: C. kubani

Binomial name
- Coptosia kubani Holzschuh, 1991

Synonyms
- Conizonia kubani Holzschuh, 1991; Phytoecia kubani Holzschuh, 1991

Species of beetle

Coptosia kubani is a species of beetle in the family Cerambycidae. It was discovered by Holzschuh in 1991, and is known to originate from Tajikistan.
