= Phytoecia demelti =

Scientific classification
- Kingdom: Animalia
- Phylum: Arthropoda
- Class: Insecta
- Order: Coleoptera
- Suborder: Polyphaga
- Infraorder: Cucujiformia
- Family: Cerambycidae
- Genus: Phytoecia
- Species: P. demelti

Binomial name
- Phytoecia demelti (Breuning, 1973)

Synonyms
- Conizonia demelti Breuning, 1973; Coptosia demelti (Breuning, 1973)

Species of beetle

Phytoecia demelti is a species of beetle in the family Cerambycidae. It was first described by Stephan von Breuning in 1973.
