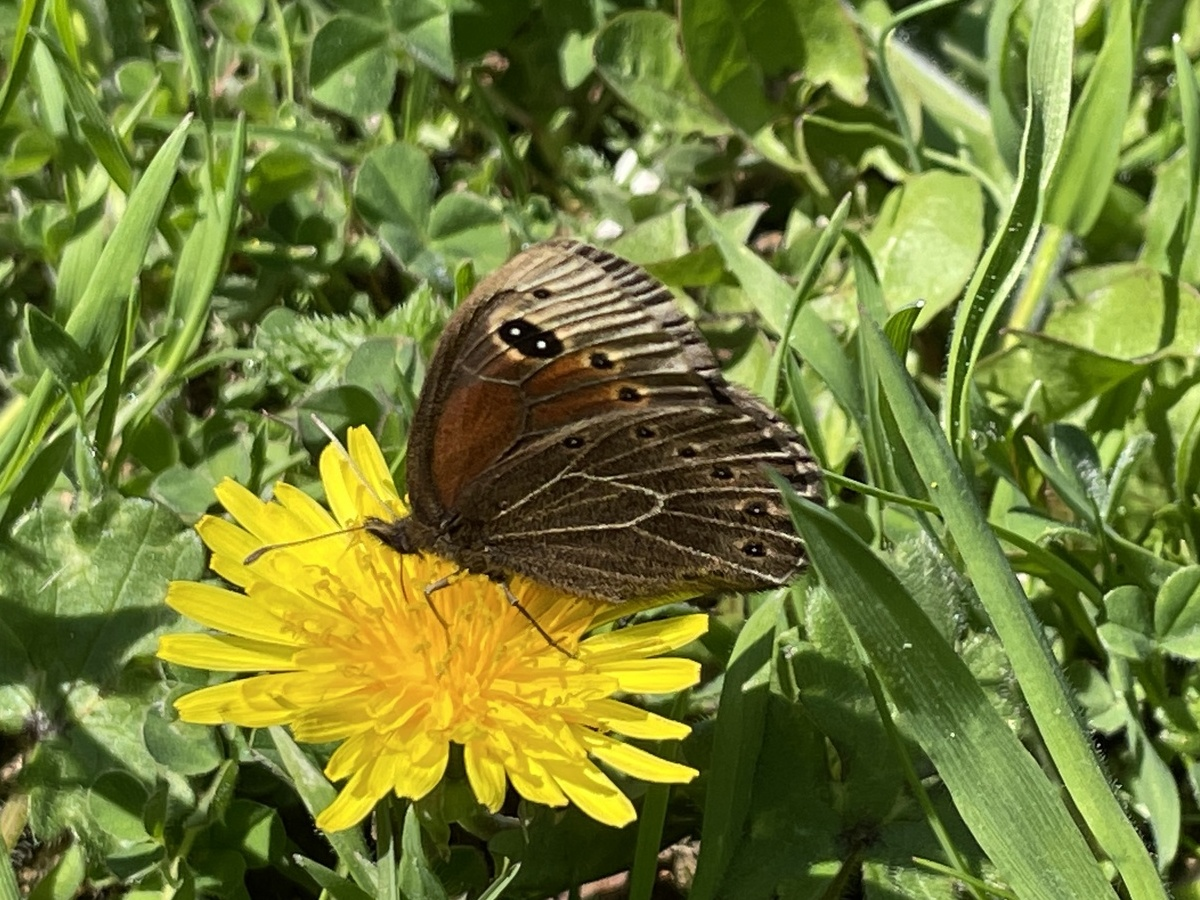

Scientific classification
- Kingdom: Animalia
- Phylum: Arthropoda
- Clade: Pancrustacea
- Class: Insecta
- Order: Lepidoptera
- Family: Nymphalidae
- Genus: Proterebia
- Species: P. afra

Binomial name
- Proterebia afra (Fabricius, 1787)

= Proterebia afra =

Species of butterfly

Proterebia afra is a small butterfly found in the Palearctic (Dalmatia, South Russia, South Urals, Kazakhstan, Caucasus, Asia Minor - Kopet-Dagh) that belongs to the browns family.

== Subspecies ==
- Proterebia afra afra
- Proterebia afra dalmata (Godart, [1824])
- Proterebia afra zyxuta (Fruhstorfer, 1918) Caucasus Major and Minor
- Proterebia afra hyrcana (Staudinger, 1901) Armenian Highland, Talysh
- Proterebia afra fidena (Fruhstorfer, 1918) Kopet-Dagh
- Proterebia afra bardines (Fruhstorfer, 1918) Altai
- Proterebia afra krymaea (Sheljuzhko, 1929) Crimea

== Description from Seitz ==
E. afer Esp. (= afra Bsd., phegea Bkh) (37 h). Hindwing above dark black-brown. The apex and usually also the upper part of the distal margin dusted with grey. The forewing with 6 -7 white-centred black ocelli in reddish yellow rings; a small one is situated near the apex of the wing, then follow 2 large ones which are more proximal, being contiguous and sometimes even merged togettier, and the remaining 3 — 4 stand beforr the distal margin and are but little smaller. Underside of the forewing sombre brown, the cell red-brown, the apex of the wing being more or less dusted with grey. The ocelli as above, but the two standing near the hindmargin are nearly always absent. The hindwing beneath black-brown with whitish grey veins and an obsolete band of the same colour. The ocelli — usually 7 — smaller than above and not bordered with reddish yellow but white-grey. The abdomen black above and grey beneath. From South Russia and Anterior Asia to East Siberia. — The form dalmata God. (37 h), is somewhat larger, the apex and distal margin are somewhat more thinly dusted with white-grey, on the hindwing beneath the veins are dark, not being shaded with white-grey as in afer. From Dalmatia and Western Kurdistan. — hyrcana Stgr. (= afra Christ.) (37 h) has the apex and distal margin densely dusted with white-grey for a considerable width, all the ocelli being visibly larger on both surfaces and bordered with light yellow rings. In Persia. — The butterflies are on the wing in spring, often already in April. They occur on rocky precipices and on slopes covered with boulders, and settle on stones. They do not appear to be plentiful in many of their flight-places.
