= Ferdinando Arborio Gattinara di Breme =

Italian naturalist and entomologist

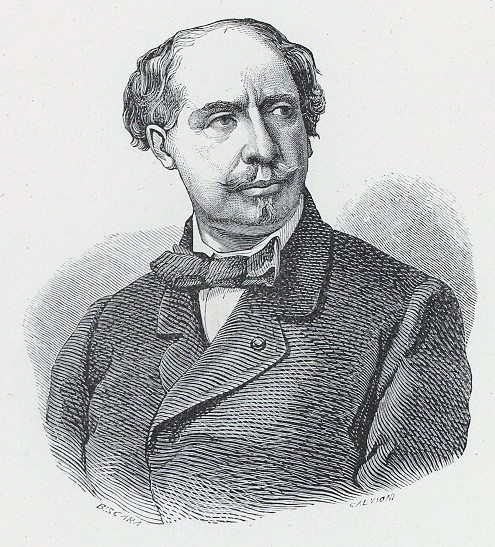
Ferdinando Arborio Gattinara di Breme

Ferdinando Arborio Gattinara di Breme (or François de Brême, or François Gattineau de Brême, or Ferdinando Arborio di Gattinara), Duc de Sartirana Lomellina, marquis de Breme (30 April 1807 in Milan – 23 January 1869 in Florence) was an Italian naturalist and entomologist who specialised in Coleoptera and Diptera. He was a sénateur of the Société entomologique de France and president of that society in 1844.

== Selected works ==
- Essai Monographique et Iconographique de la Tribu des Cossyphides. Paris : Lacheze (1842).
- "Note sur le genre Ceratitis de Macleay". Ann. Soc. Entomol. de France 11: 183-90 (1842).
