= Voyage fluvial du Tieté à l'Amazone =

1875 book by Hércules Florence

- Author: Hércules Florence
- Original title: Voyage fluvial du Tieté à l'Amazone par les provinces brésiliennes de St. Paul, Matto Grosso et Gran-Pará
- Translator: Visconde de Taunay
- Language: French, Portuguese
- Subject: Langsdorff Expedition
- Published: Brazilian Institute of Geography and Statistics
- Publication date: 1875, 1907, 2007
- Publication place: Brazil

Voyage fluvial du Tieté à l'Amazone, (or, more completely, Voyage fluvial du Tieté à l'Amazone par les provinces brésiliennes de St. Paul, Matto Grosso et Gran-Pará, French for River voyage from Tietê to the Amazon through the Brazilian provinces of St. Paul, Matto Grosso and Gran-Pará) is a book written by Hércules Florence. The work deals with the Langsdorff Expedition, which was led by Georg Heinrich von Langsdorff through São Paulo, Mato Grosso and Grão-Pará. The expedition took place from 1825 to 1829; Florence was valued for his skills both as an artist and a cartographer.

== Background ==
Hércules Florence (1804-1879), born in Nice, arrived in Rio de Janeiro in 1824 and signed up to the Langsdorff expedition after seeing an advert in a newspaper. He was chosen as the second illustrator of the expedition, whilst Adrien Taunay the Younger was hired as the first painter. The expedition, funded by Tsar Alexander I, had the aim of exploring the flora, fauna, rivers, and minerals of the interior of Brazil, from Tietê, São Paulo to the Amazon River.

The book was written in the form of a diary, when the author was only 21 years old, in French, which was Florence's mother tongue. After the conclusion of the expedition, diary was left to the Taunay family in Rio de Janeiro, who wanted to know what had happened on the expedition that had cost them their son. The diary was then forgotten about until 1874, when Viscount Taunay found it while moving house. The Viscount went to Florence's house in Campinas and asked for his permission to translate it into Portuguese and publish it. Florence agreed and the diary was published the following year.

== Content ==
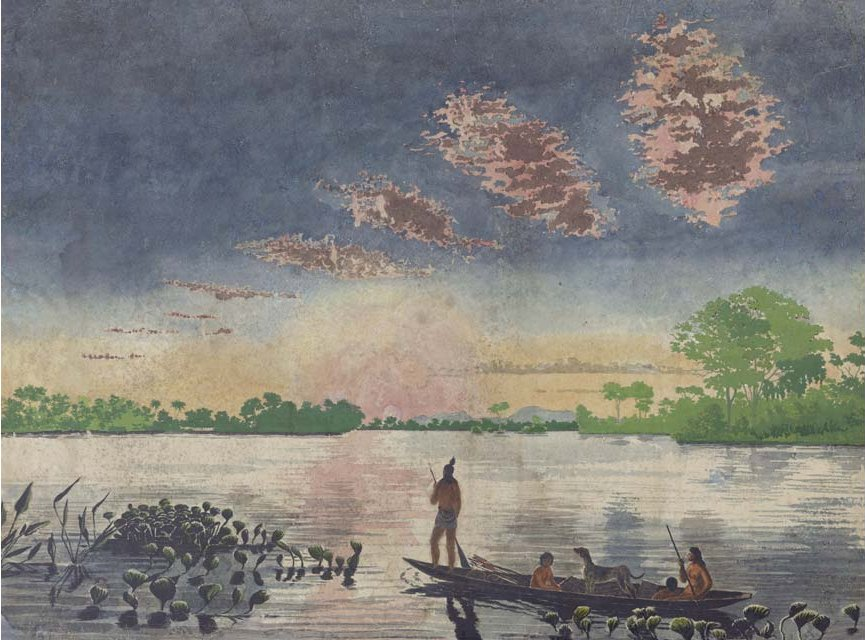
Guató canoe at sunset, by Hércules Florence

The book describes both the natural history of the interior of Brazil and its penetration by European settlers. Florence's work depicts the indigenous peoples, nature, settlements, and buildings of the interior of Brazil, and is illustrated with a number of his drawings.

The Expedition lasted from September 1825 to March 1829 and covered almost 17,000 km. Apart from Langdorff as leader and Adrien Taunay as illustrator, other members of the expedition included zoologist Édouard Ménétries, botanist Ludwig Riedel, Christian Hasse, astronomer Nester Rubtsov, and Karl von Drais. Johann Moritz Rugendas had joined Langdorff earlier but left the expedition before the river journey. The expedition was beset with problems: most members became ill with tropical fevers, and some members of the expedition died, including first painter Adrein Taunay, who drowned whilst trying to cross the Guaporé River in 1828.

== Publication ==
The book was translated into Portuguese by Viscount Taunay and published in 1875 in the Revista do Instituto Histórico e Geográfico Brasileiro of the Brazilian Institute of Geography and Statistics under the title Esboço da Viagem Feita pelo Sr. Langsdorff ao Interior do Brasil, desde setembro de 1825 até março de 1829. Escripto em original francez pelo 2o desenhista da commissão scientifica Hercules Florence. Traduzido por Alfredo d’Escragnolle Taunay.

The book has been published a number of times over the years (under the title Viagem Fluvial do Tietê ao Amazonas de 1825 a 1829) by different publishers: Melhoramentos (pt) in 1941 and 1848, by Editora Cultrix Edusp in 1977 and by Senado Federal in 2007.

It was also published in French in 1905 by the Scientific Society of Sao Paulo. A German edition was attempted but never completed.
