= Johann Moritz Rugendas =

German painter (1802–1858)

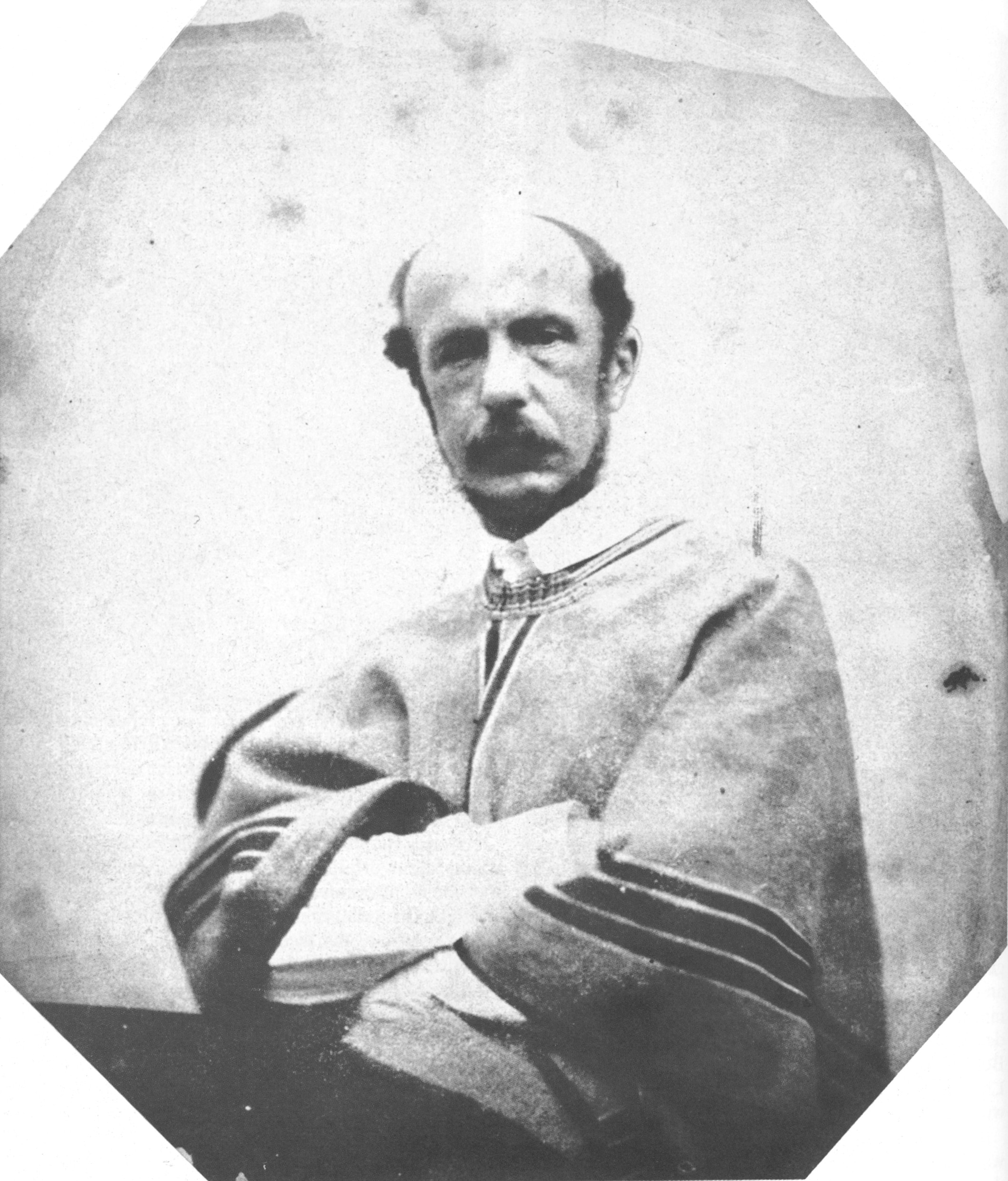
Moritz Rugendas; Calotype by Franz Hanfstaengl (before 1850).

Johann Moritz Rugendas (29 March 1802 – 29 May 1858) was a German painter, famous in the first half of the 19th century for his works depicting landscapes and ethnographic subjects in several countries in the Americas. Rugendas is considered "by far the most varied and important of the European artists to visit Latin America." He was influenced by Alexander von Humboldt.

== Biography ==
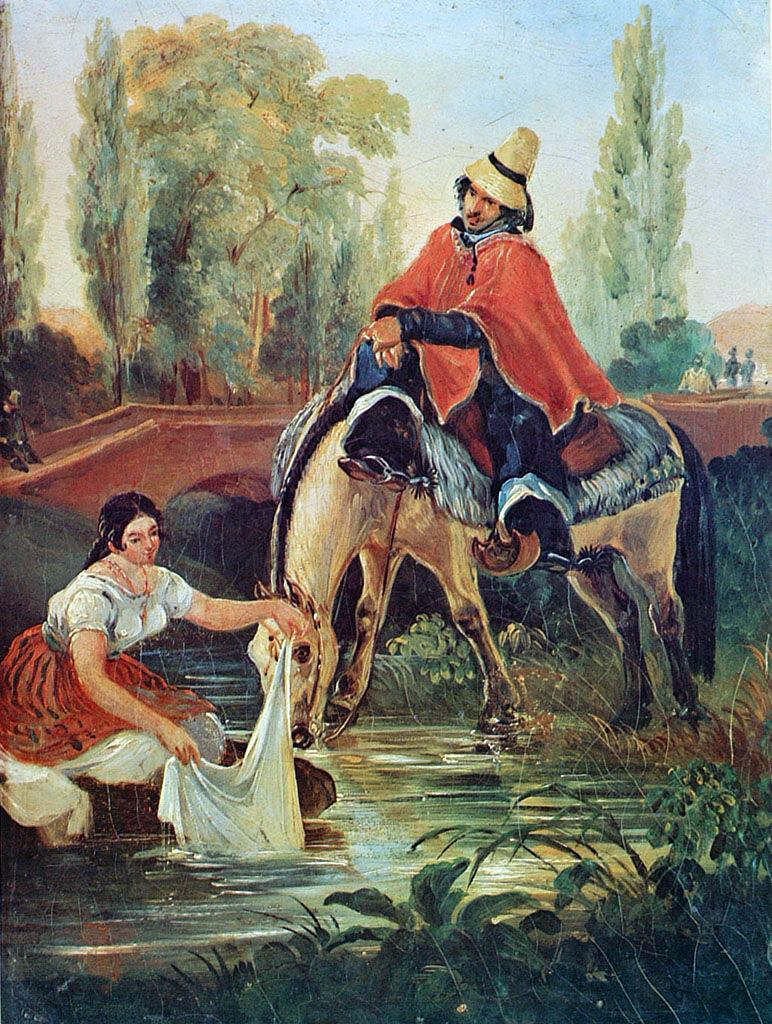
The huaso and the washerwoman

Rugendas was born in Augsburg, into the seventh generation of a family of noted painters and engravers of the city (he was a great grandson of Georg Philipp Rugendas, 1666–1742, a celebrated painter of battles). He first studied drawing and engraving with his father, Johann Lorenz Rugendas II (1775–1826). From 1815-17, he studied with Albrecht Adam (1786–1862), and later in the Academy de Arts of Munich, with Lorenzo Quaglio II (1793–1869). When Rugendas was born, Augsburg was a Free Imperial City of the Holy Roman Empire. After the Napoleonic Wars, in 1806 it had the status of a city in the newly created Kingdom of Bavaria.

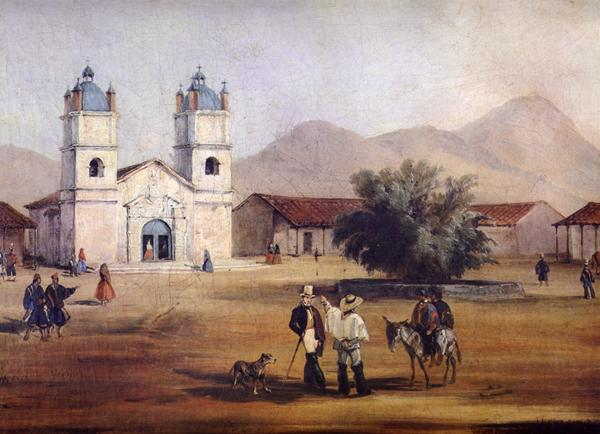
The church of Andacollo.

Rugendas was inspired by the artistic work of Thomas Ender (1793–1875) and the travel accounts in the tropics by Johann Baptist von Spix (1781–1826) and Carl von Martius (1794–1868) in the course of the Austrian Brazil Expedition, to join Baron von Langsdorff's scientific expedition to Brazil as an illustrator. Langsdorff was the consul-general of the Russian Empire in Brazil and had a plantation "Mandioca" in the northern region of Rio de Janeiro. In March 1822, they reached Brazil to Rio in the company of scientists Édouard Ménétries (1802-1861), Ludwig Riedel (1761-1861), Christian Hasse and Nester Rubtsov (1799-1874).

As illustrator, Rugendas visited the Serra da Mantiqueira and the historical towns of Barbacena, São João del Rei, Mariana, Ouro Preto, Caeté, Sabará and Santa Luzia. Just before the fluvial phase of the expedition started (a fateful journey to the Amazon), he became alienated from von Langsdorff and left the expedition. He was replaced by the artists Adrien Taunay and Hércules Florence. But Rugendas continued to live on his own in Brazil until 1825, exploring and recording his many impressions of daily life in the provinces of Minas Gerais and Rio de Janeiro. He also visited the coastal provinces of Bahia and Pernambuco on his journey back to Europe. He produced mostly drawings and watercolors.

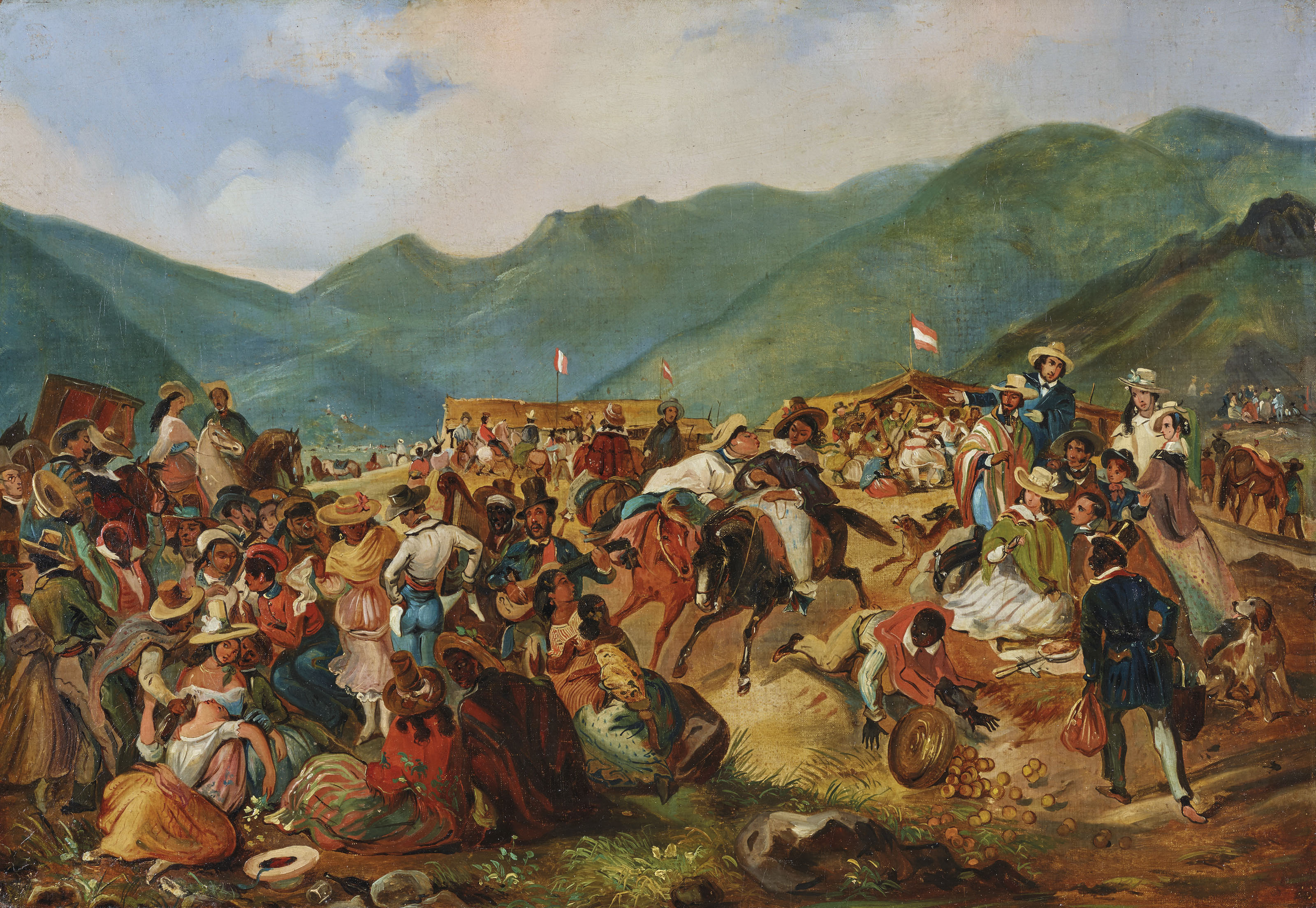
Feast of San Juan in Amancaes. Lima, 1843.

On his return to Europe between 1825 and 1828, Rugendas lived successively in Paris, Augsburg and Munich, with the aim of learning new art techniques, such as oil painting. There, he published from 1827 to 1835, with the help of Victor Aimé Huber, his monumental book Voyage Pittoresque dans le Brésil (Picturesque Voyage to Brazil), with more than 500 illustrations. It was considered one of the most important documents about Brazil in the 19th century.

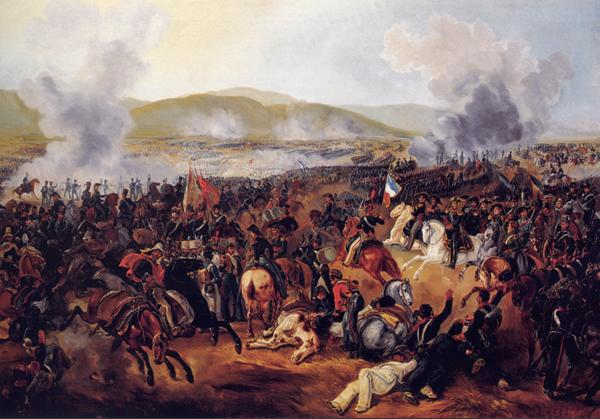
Battle of Maipu

He spent time studying in Italy. Inspired by explorer and naturalist, Alexander Humboldt (1769–1859), Rugendas sought financial support for a much more ambitious project of recording pictorially the life and nature of Latin America. In his word, it would be "an endeavor to truly become the illustrator of life in the New World". In 1831 he traveled first to Haiti, and then to Mexico. In Mexico, he did drawings and watercolors of Morelia, Teotihuacan, Xochimilco, and Cuernavaca. He illustrated the book Mexico and the Mexicans by C. Sartorius. Rugendas also began to practice oil painting, with excellent results. After becoming involved in a failed coup in 1834 against Mexico's president, Anastasio Bustamante, Rugendas was incarcerated and expelled from the country.

From 1834 to 1844 he travelled to Chile, Argentina, Uruguay, Peru and Bolivia, and finally returned in 1845 to Rio de Janeiro. Well-accepted and feted by the court of Emperor Dom Pedro II of Brazil, he executed portraits of several members of the royal court and participated in an artistic exposition. At the age of 44, in 1846, Rugendas departed for Europe. The novel An Episode in the Life of a Landscape Painter by Argentinian writer César Aira is a surreal fictional account of Rugendas's trips to Argentina.

== Depicting black people in Brazil ==
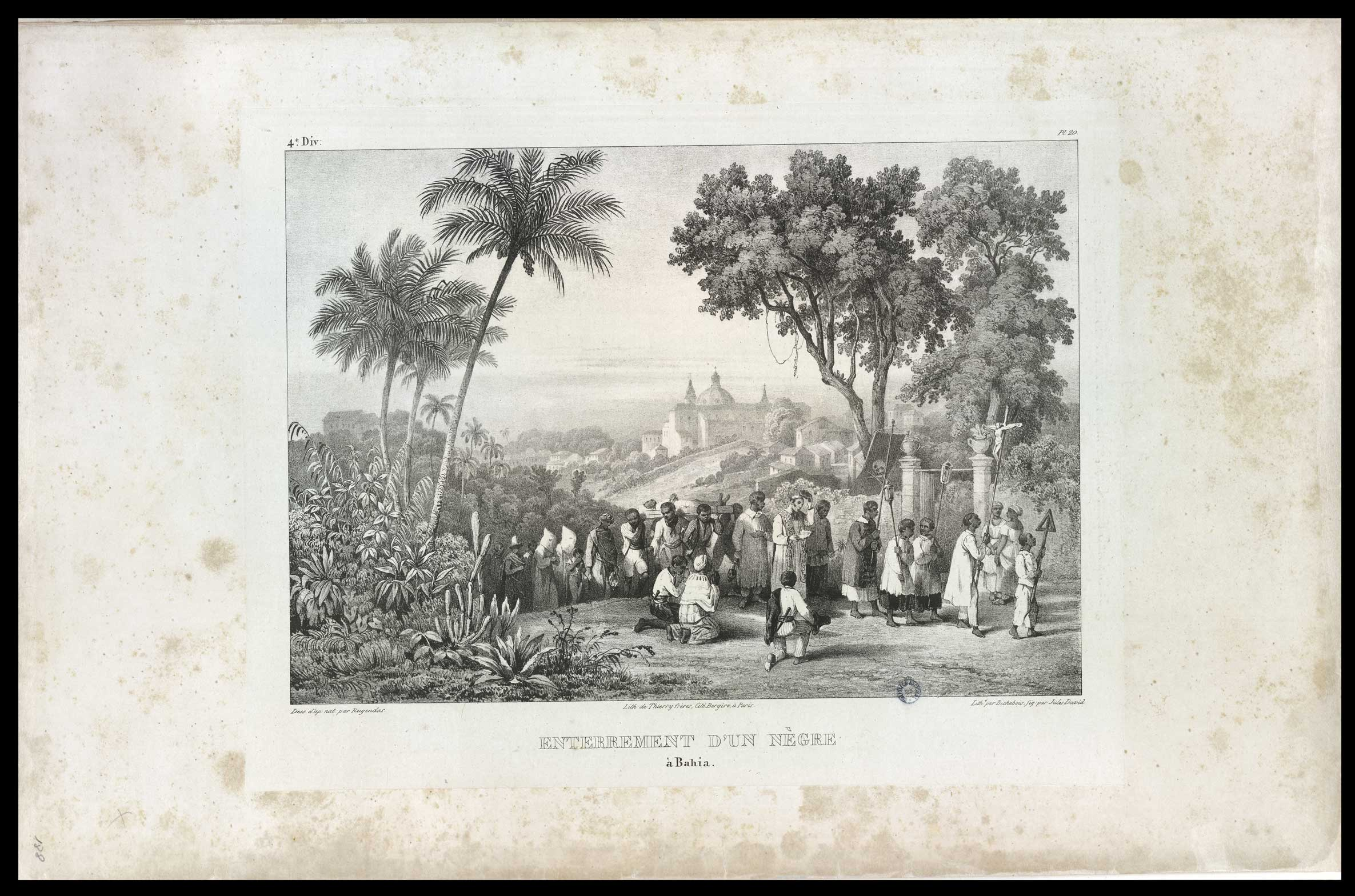
Enterro de um Negro. Lithograph by Johann Moritz Rugendas.

From 1822 to 1825, as part of the Langsdorff expedition, Rugendas depicted black people living in Brazil. Along with other ethnographic artists who worked in Brazil, such as Jean-Baptiste Debret, and François-August Biard, Rugendas is part of the tropical romanticism. This movement challenged the dichotomy between nature and civilization and considered places such as colonial Brazil to be a harmonious environment of racial mixing.

Tropical romanticism was one of the elements that influenced Rugendas's representations of black people. According to Freitas, Rugendas illustrated black people of varied origins. This type of illustration details the physical characteristics of black men and women by focusing on hairstyles, adornments, marks and scars, and types of nose, lips, and eyes, demonstrating the ethnographic purpose of these drawings. In the same lithograph, the artist depicts four or five busts of men and women to compare differences and similarities among nations of origin, but also to identify different degrees of civilization. He identified more savage people by depicting them with skin marks and deformities, and normally without clothes. On the other hand, criollos were represented wearing clothes and jewelry, as if to mark a step forward toward civilization if compared with black Africans. Rugendas celebrated black people born in Brazil, saying they were more polished and benevolent than Africans.

Secondly, Rugendas depicted black people in scenes. These painted images presented activities of urban work, such as street commerce, water transportation, and laundry. The main focus was in the activity and the landscape rather than in detailing variation among blacks of different origins. For this reason, he portrayed a generic type of black in such scenes. Rugendas represented the work performed by black people as a civilizing element that allowed them to develop themselves and to have social mobility.

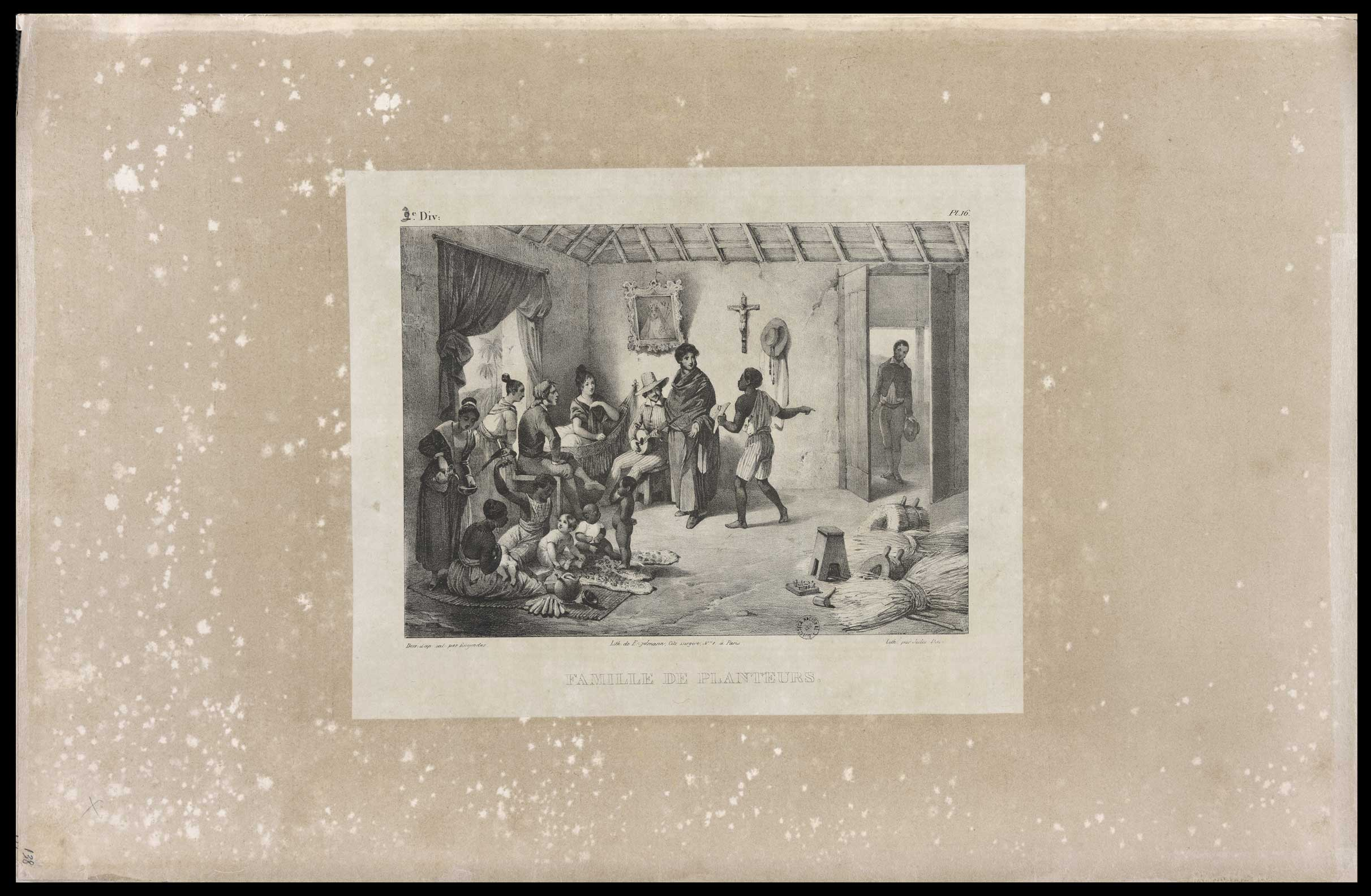
Familia de Agricultores. Lithograph by Johann Moritz Rugendas.

Influenced by Alexander von Humboldt's ideas, Rugendas considered environmental conditions to be determinant factors to human development. He believed that the lack of what he considered formal education and civilizing elements in Africa contributed to the inferiority of the African race. Humboldt was an abolitionist, and Rugendas similarly disapproved of the Brazilian slavery system. He supported a gradual and progressive emancipation. The historian Robert Slenes said that Rugendas's political agenda that worked together with his ethnographic studies. To Slenes, the artist compromised with a conservative Christian reformism, typical of the abolitionist movement. Although Rugendas defended gradual emancipation, the artist also believed that Brazilian slavery represented a new, positive life for Africans, who got the chance to learn the Christian experience. In some images, for example the Enterro de um Negro na Bahia, Rugendas identified the dead body of a "black man with another corpse: the suffering Christ the ‘Savior’ honored by the city's name." There are other images where elements of Catholicism are present, such as Mercado de Negros (a slave market with a church in the background) and Familia de Agricultores, the latter one of the few images in which Rugendas portrays black people in private environments; they are slaves or servants to the white family.

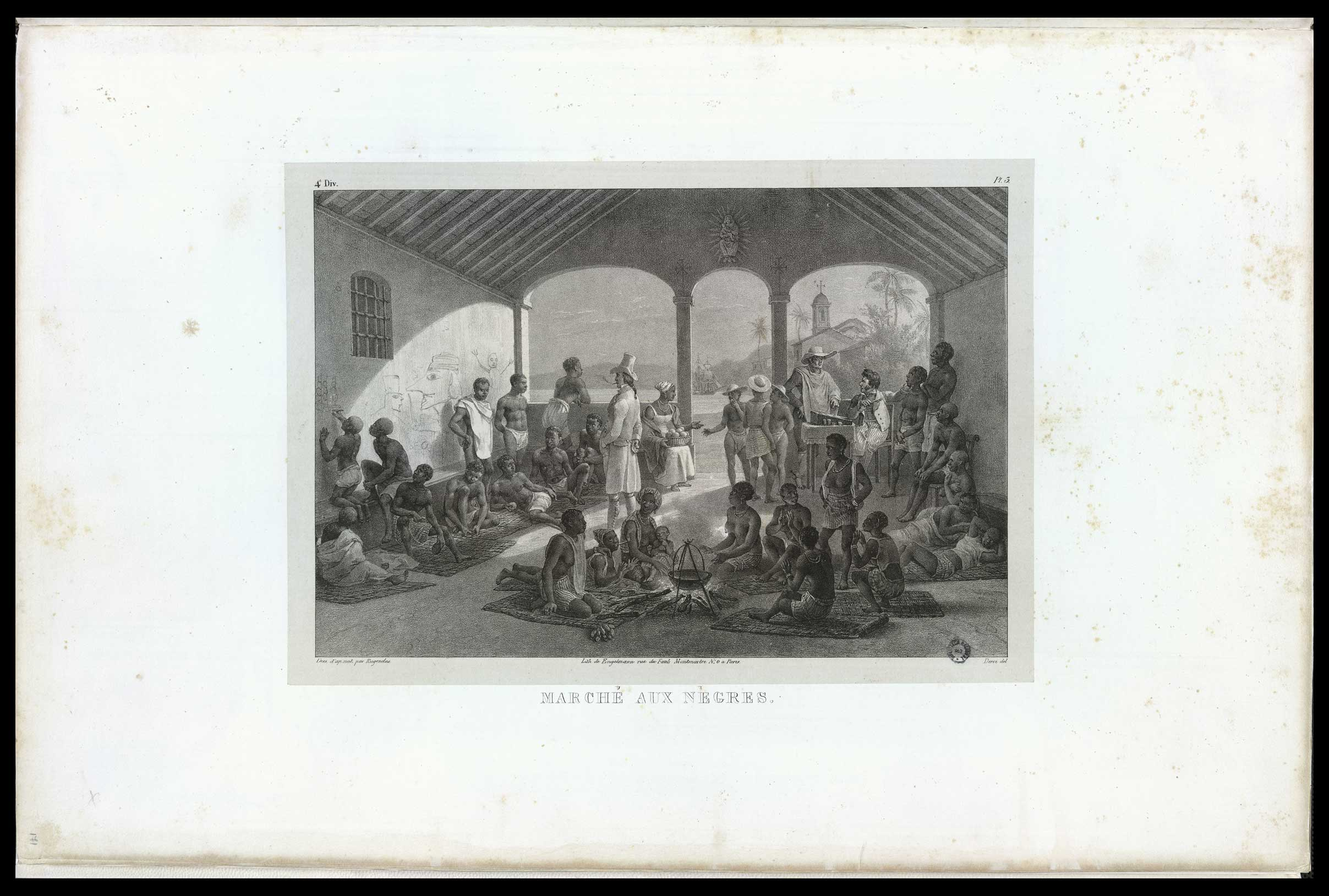
Mercado de Negros. Lithograph by Johann Moritz Rugendas.

Petrônio Domingues says that the artistic work of foreigner painters and ethnographers in nineteenth-century Brazil had a strong influence on the development of the racial imaginary. The romantic view on slavery in Brazil as a civilizing influence, contributed to creation of the myth of racial democracy. Outside Brazil, the images Rugendas produced had relative success. He published a book with his travel log and a collection of one hundred pictures; it was called Viagem Pitoresca através do Brazil, in Portuguese; Voyage Pittoresque dans le Brésil, in French; and Malerische Reise in Brasilien, in German. During the nineteenth century, there was increased publication of travel books and the development of lithographs to illustrate them. Rugendas's images helped to spread the idea of racial harmony inside and outside Brazil.

== Death ==
He died on 29 May 1858 in Weilheim an der Teck, Germany. King Maximilian II of Bavaria had acquired most of his works in exchange for a life pension. His painting Columbus Taking Possession of the New World (1855) has been on view at the Neue Pinakothek, in Munich.

== See also ==
- Ludwig Riedel
- Francis de Castelnau
- Sigismund Ernst Richard Krone
- Peter Clausen (naturalist)
- Jean-Batiste Debret
- François-August Biard
