= Phytoecia compacta =

Scientific classification
- Domain: Eukaryota
- Kingdom: Animalia
- Phylum: Arthropoda
- Class: Insecta
- Order: Coleoptera
- Suborder: Polyphaga
- Infraorder: Cucujiformia
- Family: Cerambycidae
- Genus: Phytoecia
- Species: P. compacta

Binomial name
- Phytoecia compacta (Ménétries, 1832)

Synonyms
- Conizonia compacta (Ménétries, 1832); Coptosia compacta (Ménétries, 1832); Coptosia nigrosuturata Heyrovský, 1950; Saperda compacta Ménétries, 1833

Species of beetle

Phytoecia compacta is a species of beetle in the family Cerambycidae. It was first described by Édouard Ménétries in 1832, originally under the genus Saperda. It is known from Armenia, Azerbaijan, Georgia, Iran, Israel, Jordan, Lebanon, Syria, and Turkey.

== Subspecies ==
- Phytoecia compacta compacta (Ménétries, 1832)
- Phytoecia compacta sancta Reiche, 1877
