= Dorcadion ferruginipes =

Scientific classification
- Kingdom: Animalia
- Phylum: Arthropoda
- Clade: Pancrustacea
- Class: Insecta
- Order: Coleoptera
- Suborder: Polyphaga
- Infraorder: Cucujiformia
- Family: Cerambycidae
- Genus: Dorcadion
- Species: D. ferruginipes

Binomial name
- Dorcadion ferruginipes Ménétries, 1836

Synonyms
- Pedestredorcadion ferruginipes (Ménétriés) Sama, 2002

Species of beetle

Dorcadion ferruginipes is a species of beetle in the family Cerambycidae. It was described by Édouard Ménétries in 1836. It is known from Turkey.
