= Harpalus fuscicornis =

Scientific classification
- Kingdom: Animalia
- Phylum: Arthropoda
- Class: Insecta
- Order: Coleoptera
- Suborder: Adephaga
- Family: Carabidae
- Genus: Harpalus
- Species: H. fuscicornis

Binomial name
- Harpalus fuscicornis Ménétries, 1832

Species of beetle

Harpalus fuscicornis is a species of ground beetle in the subfamily Harpalinae. It was described by Édouard Ménétries in 1832.
