= Carabus wiedemanni =

Scientific classification
- Domain: Eukaryota
- Kingdom: Animalia
- Phylum: Arthropoda
- Class: Insecta
- Order: Coleoptera
- Suborder: Adephaga
- Family: Carabidae
- Genus: Carabus
- Species: C. wiedemanni

Binomial name
- Carabus wiedemanni Menetries, 1836

Species of beetle

Carabus wiedemanni is a species of beetle from family Carabidae, found in Bulgaria, Greece, European part of Turkey, and Near East.
