= Hércules Florence =

Monegasque-Brazilian painter

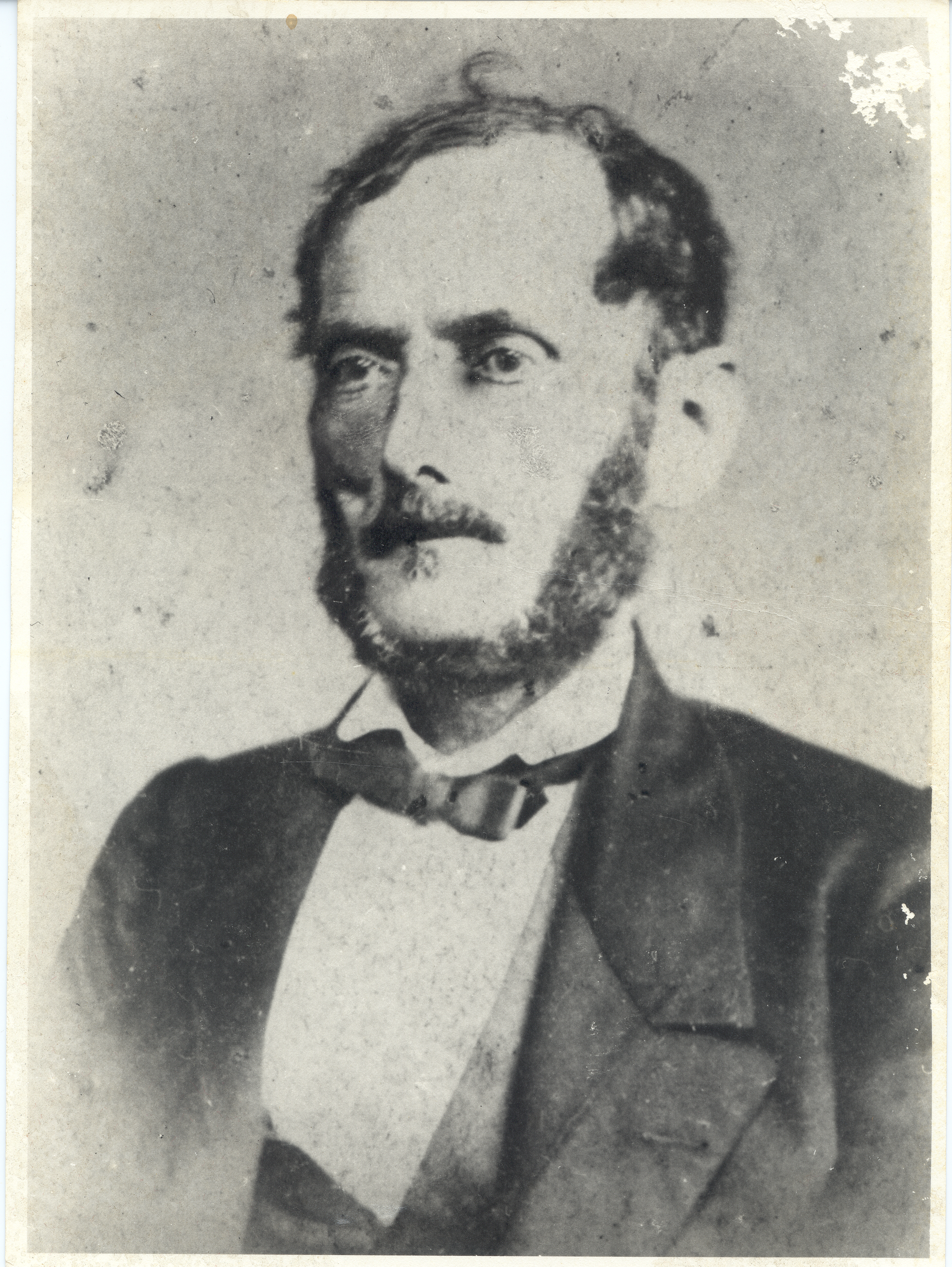
- Portrait, c. 1870–79
- Born: Antoine Hercule Romuald Florence; 28 February 1804; Nice, France
- Died: 27 March 1879 (aged 75); Campinas, Brazil
- Occupations: Inventor; photographer
- Known for: Pioneering photography; Earliest use of the word "photography"
- Spouses: Maria Angélica Vasconcellos (1830–1850); Carolina Krug (1854–1879)
- Children: 13 (with Maria Angélica); 7 (with Carolina)

Antoine Hercule Romuald Florence (29 February 1804 – 27 March 1879) was a French-Brazilian painter and inventor, known as the isolate inventor of photography in Brazil, three years before Daguerre (but six years after Nicéphore Niépce), using the matrix negative/positive, still in use. According to Kossoy, who examined Florence's notes, he referred to his process, in French, as photographie in 1834, at least four years before John Herschel coined the English word photography.

== Early life ==
Hercules Florence was born on 29 February 1804 in Nice, France, the son of Arnaud Florence (1749–1807), a tax collector, and Augustine de Vignolis, a minor noblewoman. As a child he manifested interest for drawing and the sciences, as well as for the voyages of the great explorers to the New World and already as a 14-year-old boy he worked as a calligrapher and draftsman in Monaco, where his parents had been living since 1807.

After a period of wandering and working on board of warships and merchant ships, Hércules Florence set sail to Brazil as a crew member of the French warship Marie Thérèze, arriving in the port of Rio de Janeiro on 1 May 1824, two years after the declaration of independence from Portugal. He was already an accomplished draftsman and painter with considerable talent and many scientific interests, particularly in the natural sciences and ethnography. Soon after his arrival, he got a job in a women's fashion store and then as a lithographer in a bookstore and printing shop, owned by his compatriot Pierre Plancher.

== The great expedition ==
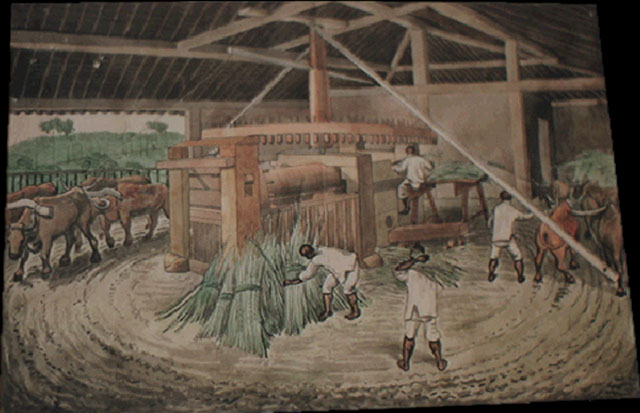
Sugar cane mill in São Carlos, 1840

Florence's life changed dramatically when he decided to respond to a newspaper advertisement put by Baron von Langsdorff (1773–1852), the consul general of the Russian Empire in Brazil, a German-born physician and naturalist who was organizing on behalf of the Russian Imperial Academy of Sciences a scientific expedition to the Amazon. He was hired as an illustrator and topographic draftsman, together with German painter Johann Moritz Rugendas (1802–1858) and the young French illustrator Adrien Taunay (1803–1828). In the year of 1825 they travelled by sea from Rio to the village of Santos. Florence eventually published his memoirs of the expedition in Voyage fluvial du Tieté à l'Amazone. This expedition lasts from June 1826 to March 1829, when, exhausted, sick, the survivors arrived in Rio, after a large journey in the Paraguay and Amazon Basin.

== Shop-keeper and inventor ==
Soon after the end of the expedition, in 1830, Florence married Maria Angélica de Vasconcellos, the daughter of his acquaintance and benefactor Francisco Álvares Machado, and went to live with her in the city of Campinas (then named Vila de São Carlos), in the province of São Paulo. There he became a successful farmer, publisher, and owner of the first printer in the town, and in Campinas, he remained for the next 49 years until his death in 1879. Maria died in 1850; four years later he married Carolina Krug, a German immigrant born in 1828 in Kassel. Together they founded in 1863 a school for girls, the Florence College, which was moved to Jundiai after Hercule's death. He fathered a total of 20 children, being 13 with Maria Angélica and 7 with Carolina.

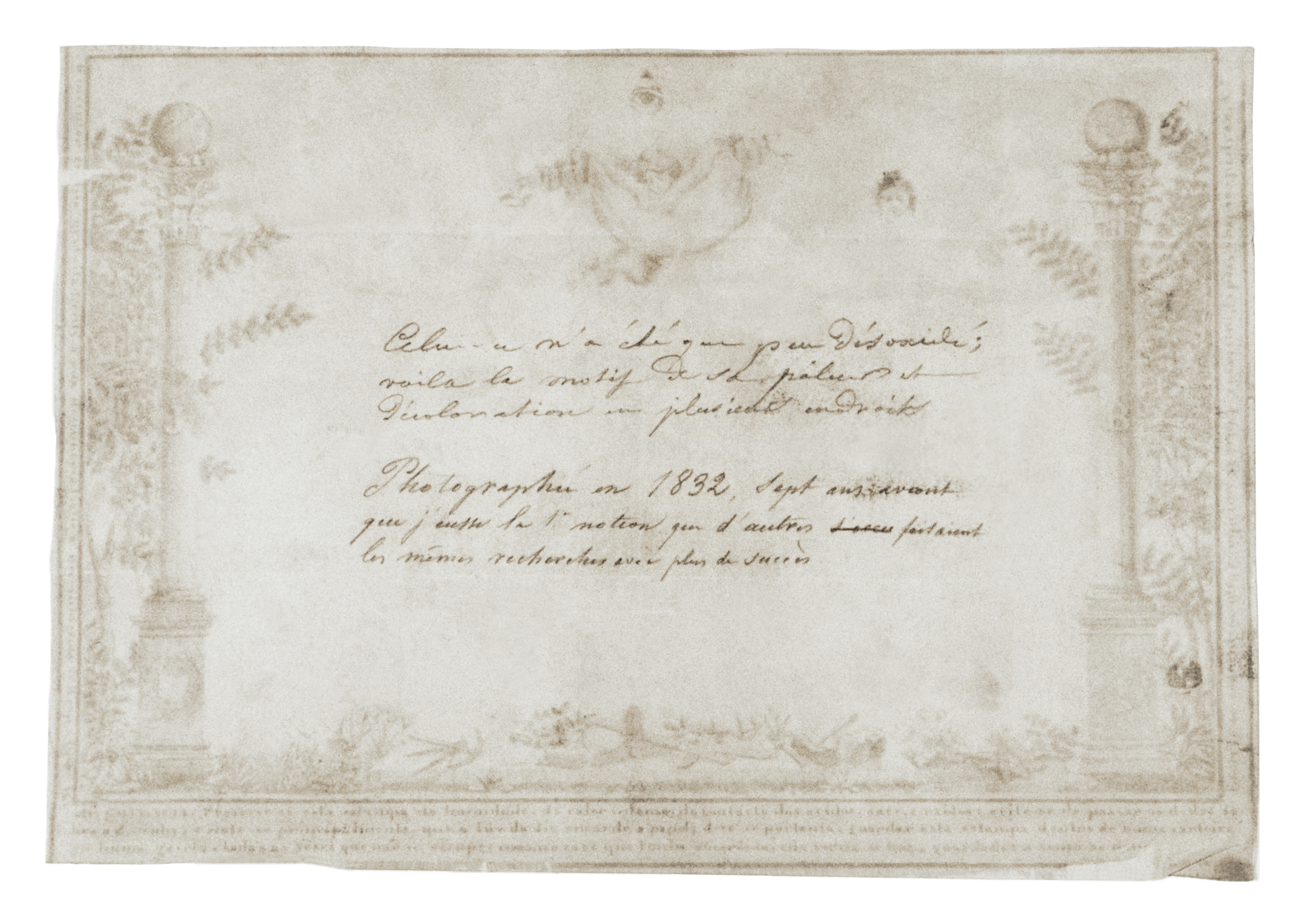
Photocopy of a diploma made using Florence's photographic technique, c. 1833

Soon after settling in Campinas, Hércules Florence began a prolific career as inventor and businessman. During the Langsdorff expedition, he had developed a new system of using musical notation to record the songs of birds and vocalizations of other animals, which he named "zoophonia". Then, in 1830, when he was searching for a simplified way of printing his more than 200 illustrations performed during the Langsdorff Expedition, other than using expensive and time-consuming engravings on wood and metal (xylography and lithography), he invented a new process, similar to the mimeograph, which he named "polygraphia", and began using this commercially in his printing office. As his technique evolved, he was able to combine colors, and to produce uncounterfeitable bank notes.

In 1833, with the help of a pharmacist friend, Joaquim Correa de Mello, Florence began to study ways of permanently fixing camera obscura images, which he named "photographia". They settled on silver nitrate on paper, a combination which had been the subject of experiments by Thomas Wedgwood around the year 1800. Unlike Wedgwood, who was unable to make photographs of real-world scenes with his camera or render the photograms that he did produce light-fast, Florence's notebooks indicate that he eventually succeeded in doing both. Unfortunately, partly because he never published his invention adequately, partly because he was an obscure inventor living in a remote and undeveloped province, Hércules Florence was never recognized internationally as one of the inventors of photography during his lifetime. He died in Campinas, Brazil.

A photographic image of several pharmaceutical flask labels, produced by Hercules Florence in Campinas, Brazil, in 1833 and entitled Epréuve Nº2 (photographie), currently in the collection of the Moreira Salles Institute (IMS) in São Paulo Brazil, (acquired by the IMS in 2002 from the collection of Pedro Corrêa do Lago), is described by the IMS as the "oldest photographic record existing on the American continent, based on the sensitivity of silver salts to light".

== Cultural references ==
A film documentary, featuring Adriana Florence, a grand-grand-granddaughter of Hércules Florence living in Campinas, Brazil, has been made by the Discovery Channel and retraces part of the Baron von Langsdorff expedition's itinerary. It also visited the St. Petersburg's Langsdorff museum collections. The director was Mauricio Dias.

== Publications ==
- Florence, Hércules. Voyage fluvial du Tieté à l'Amazone, published in Portuguese as Viagem Fluvial do Tietê ao Amazonas. Hércules Florence, Brazilian edition with translation by Francisco Álvares Machado and Vasconcellos Florence, Museu de Arte de São Paulo Assis Chateaubriand, 1977.

== Gallery ==
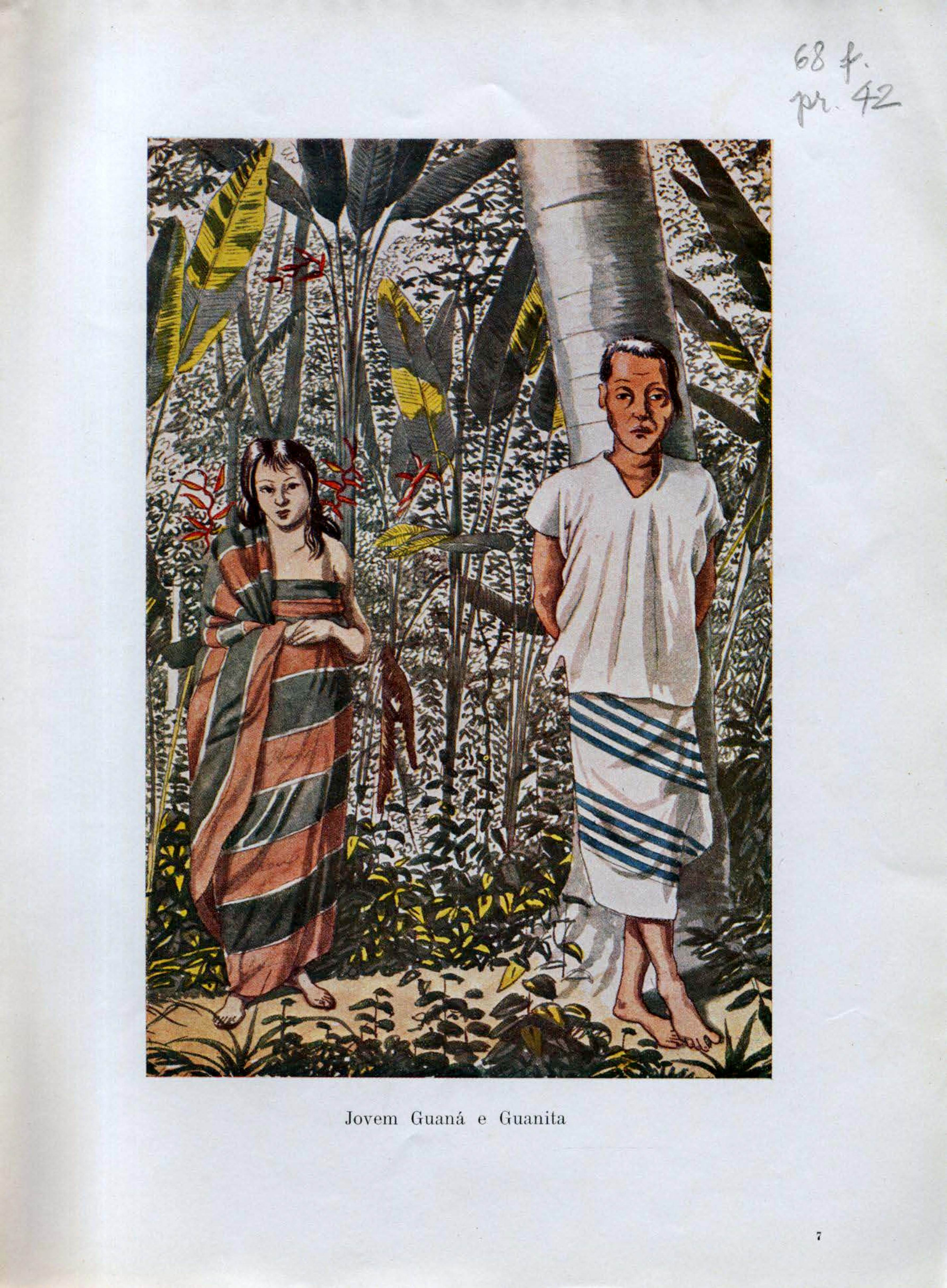
Man and Woman of the Amazon River

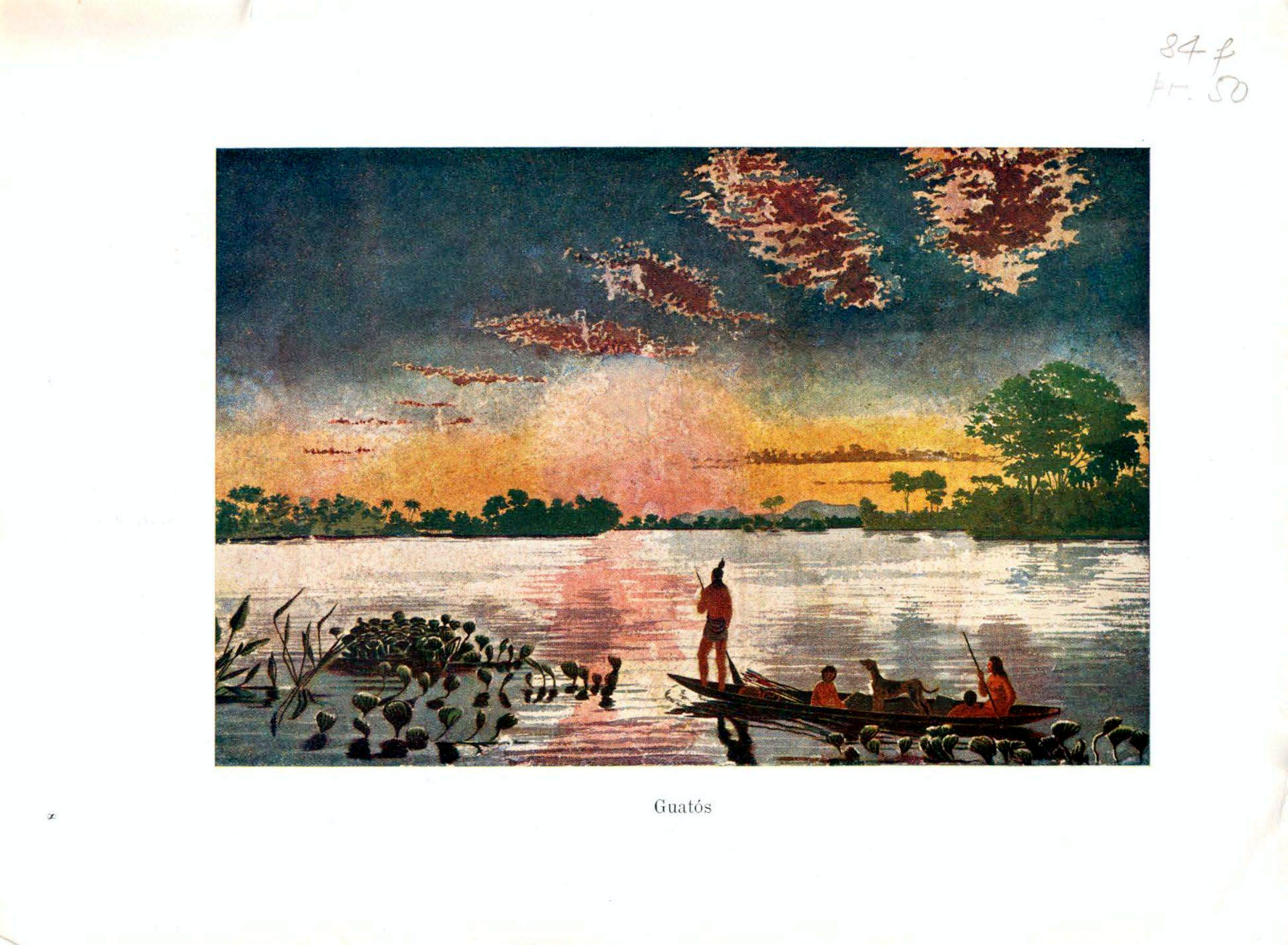
Guatós of the Amazon River

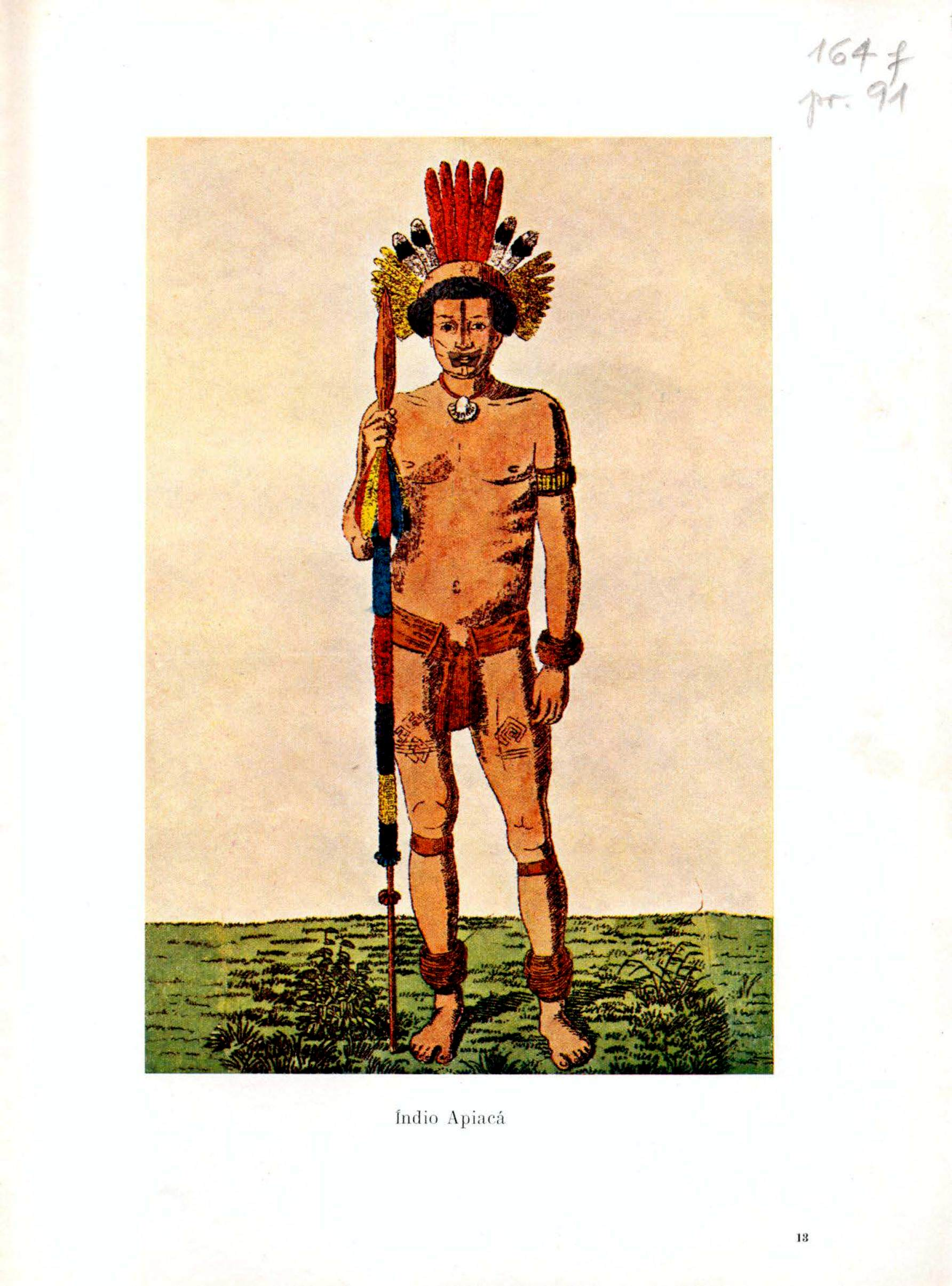
Apiacé native of the Amazon River

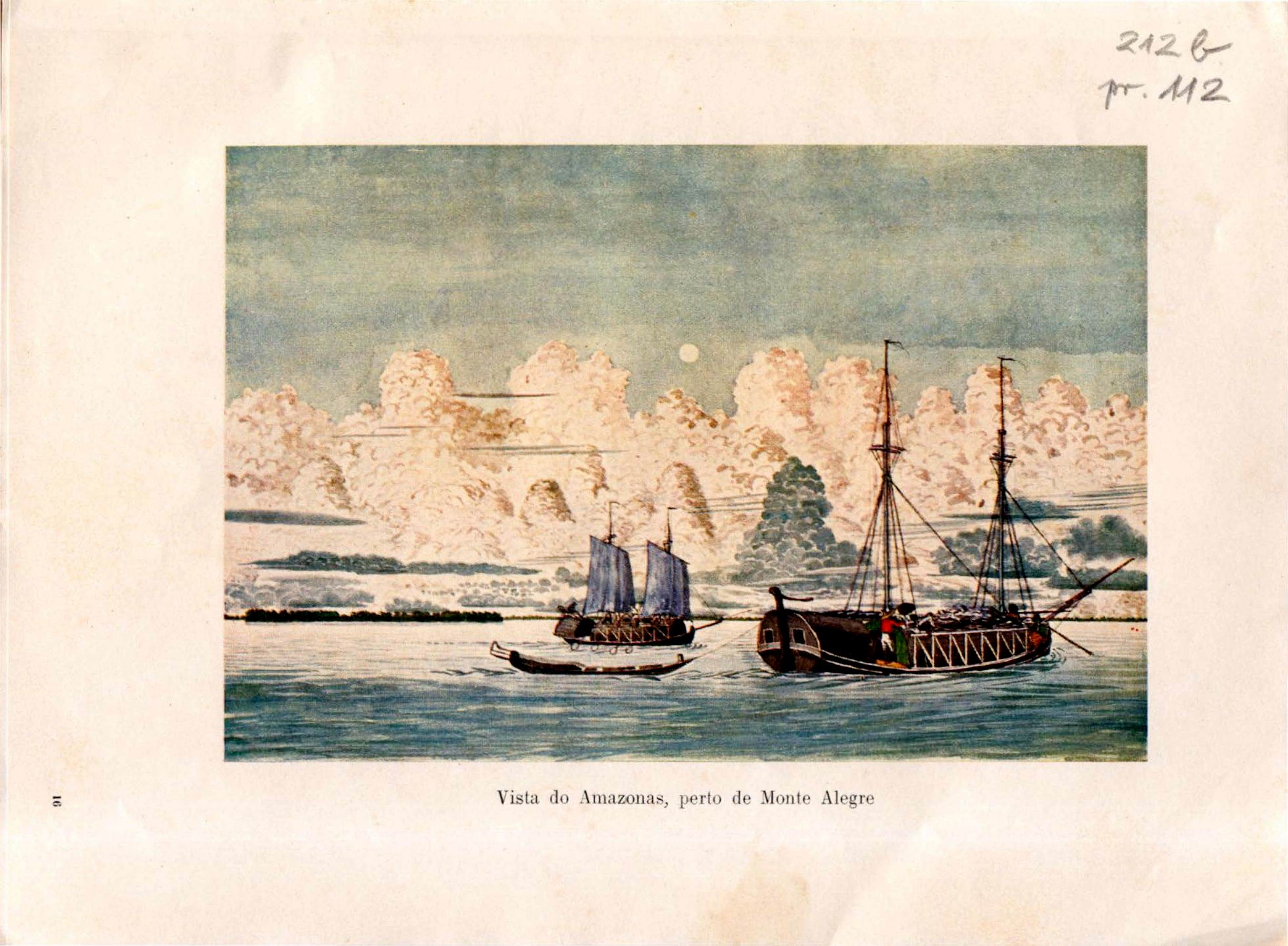
View near Monte Alegre of the Amazon River

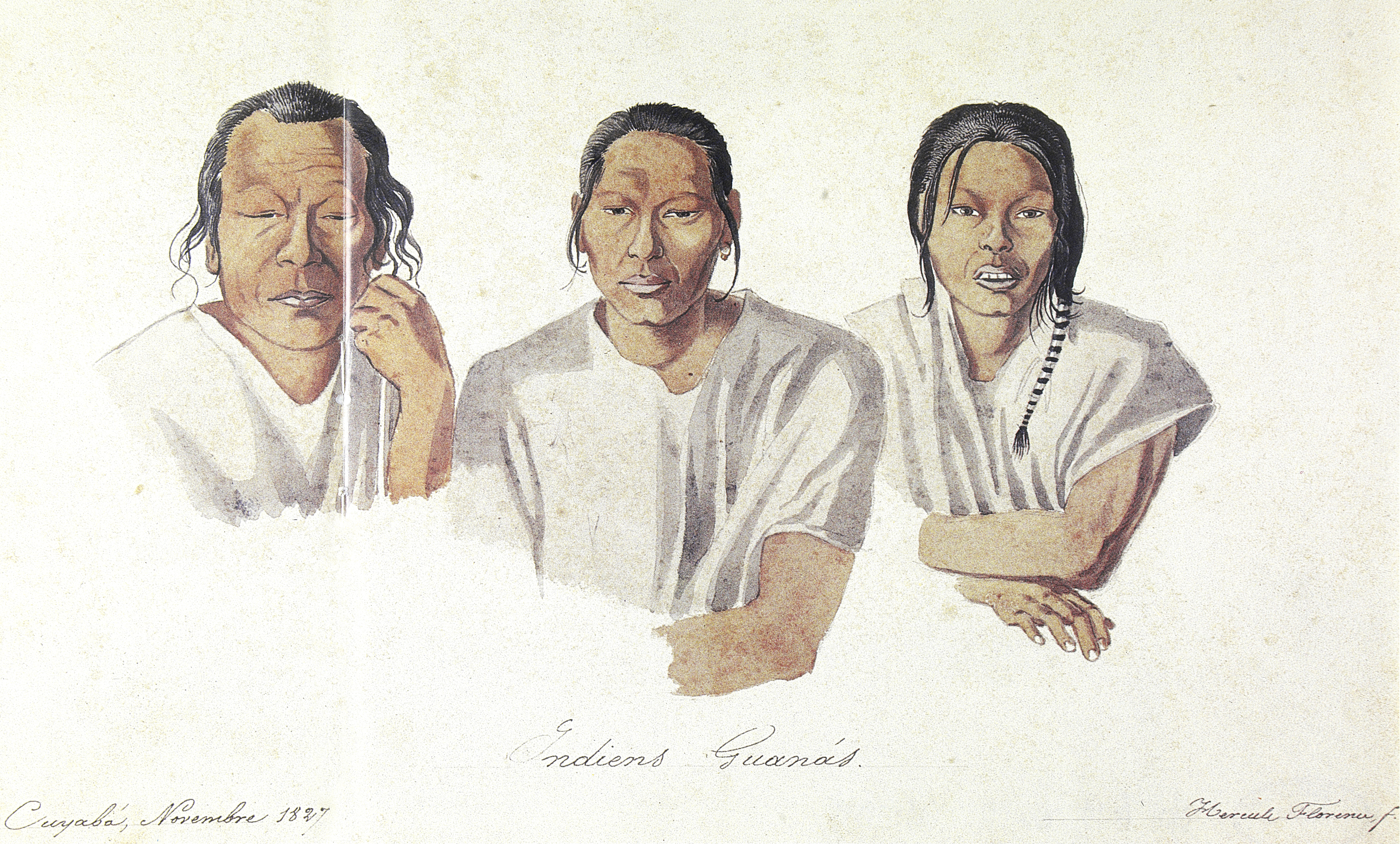

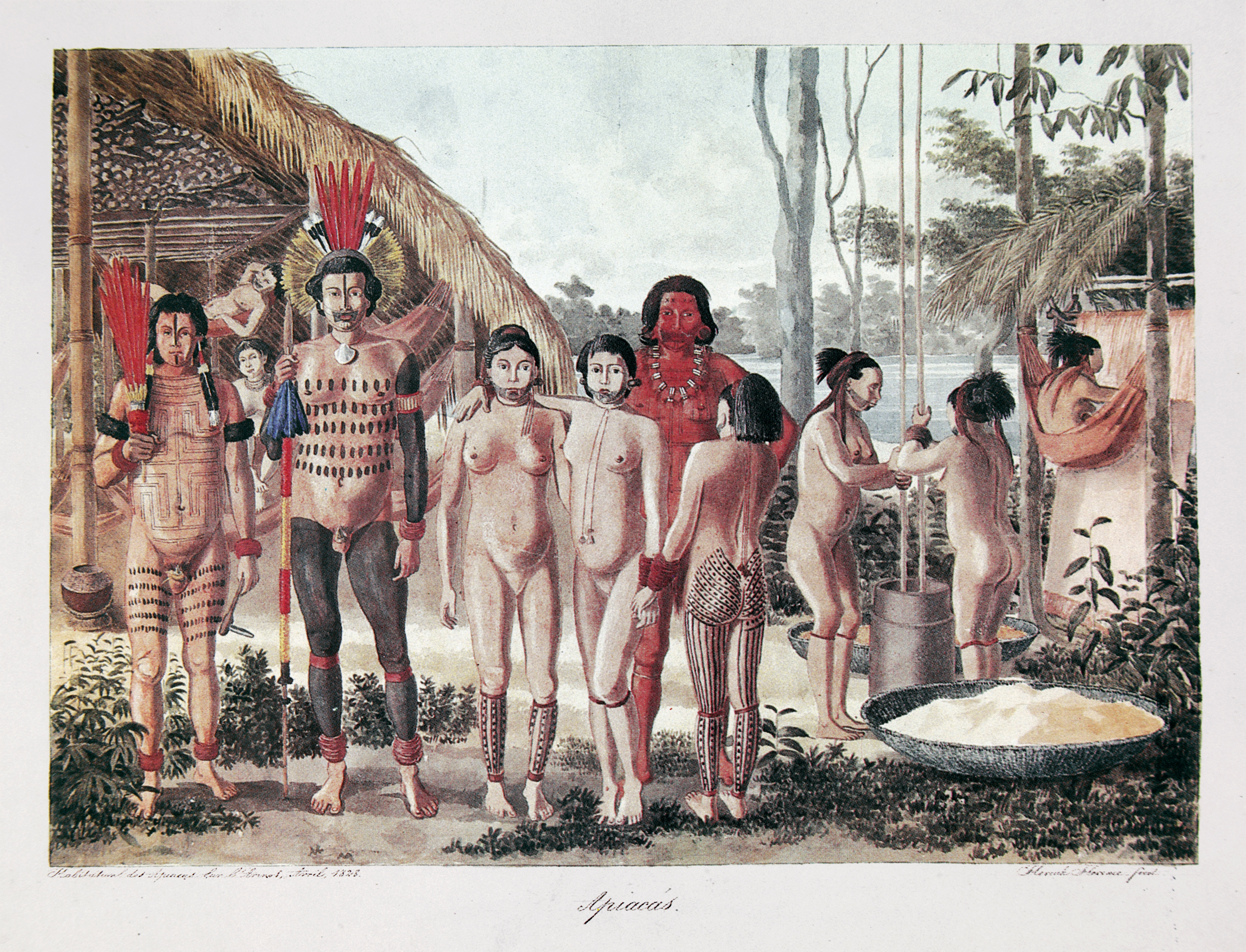

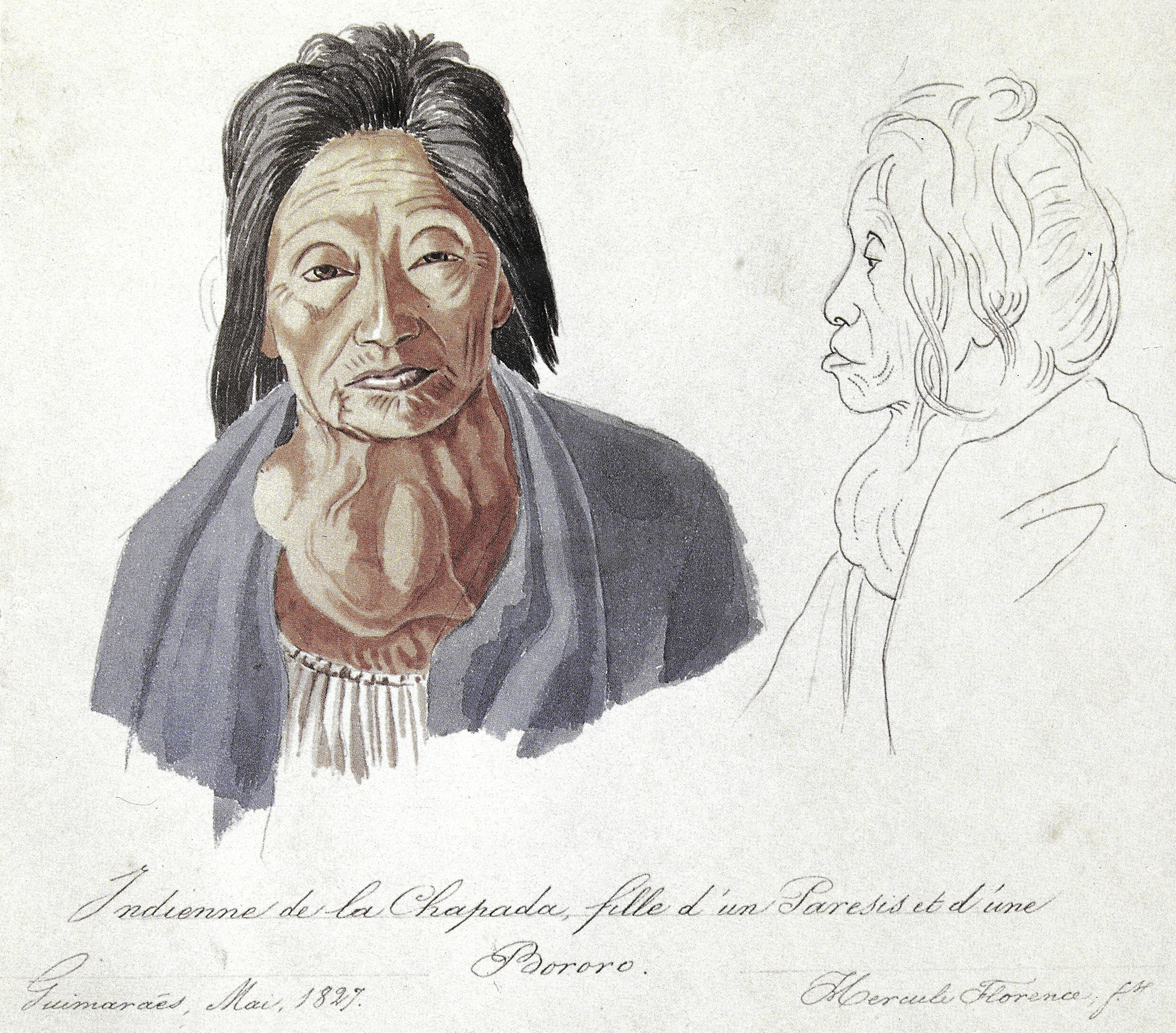

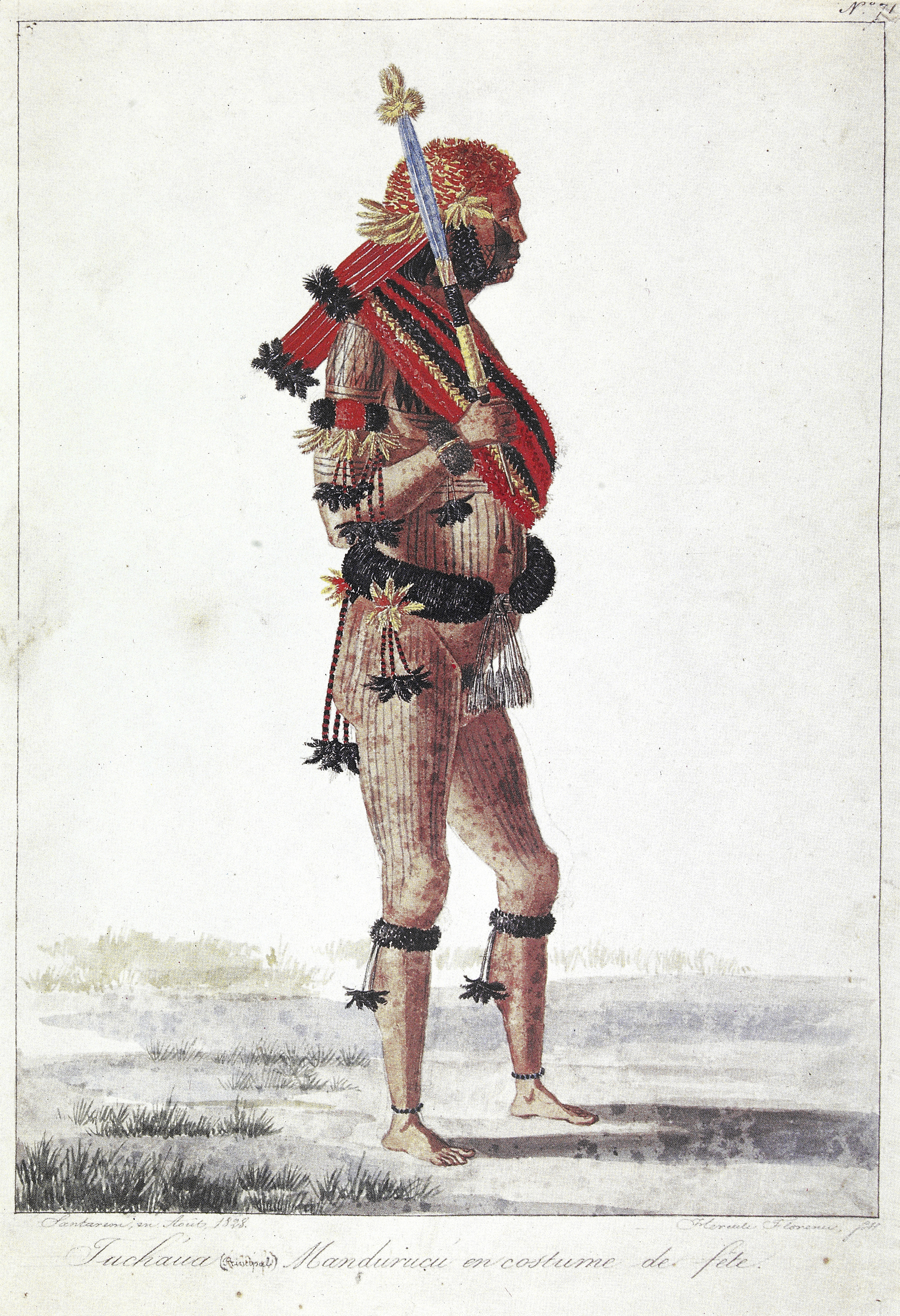

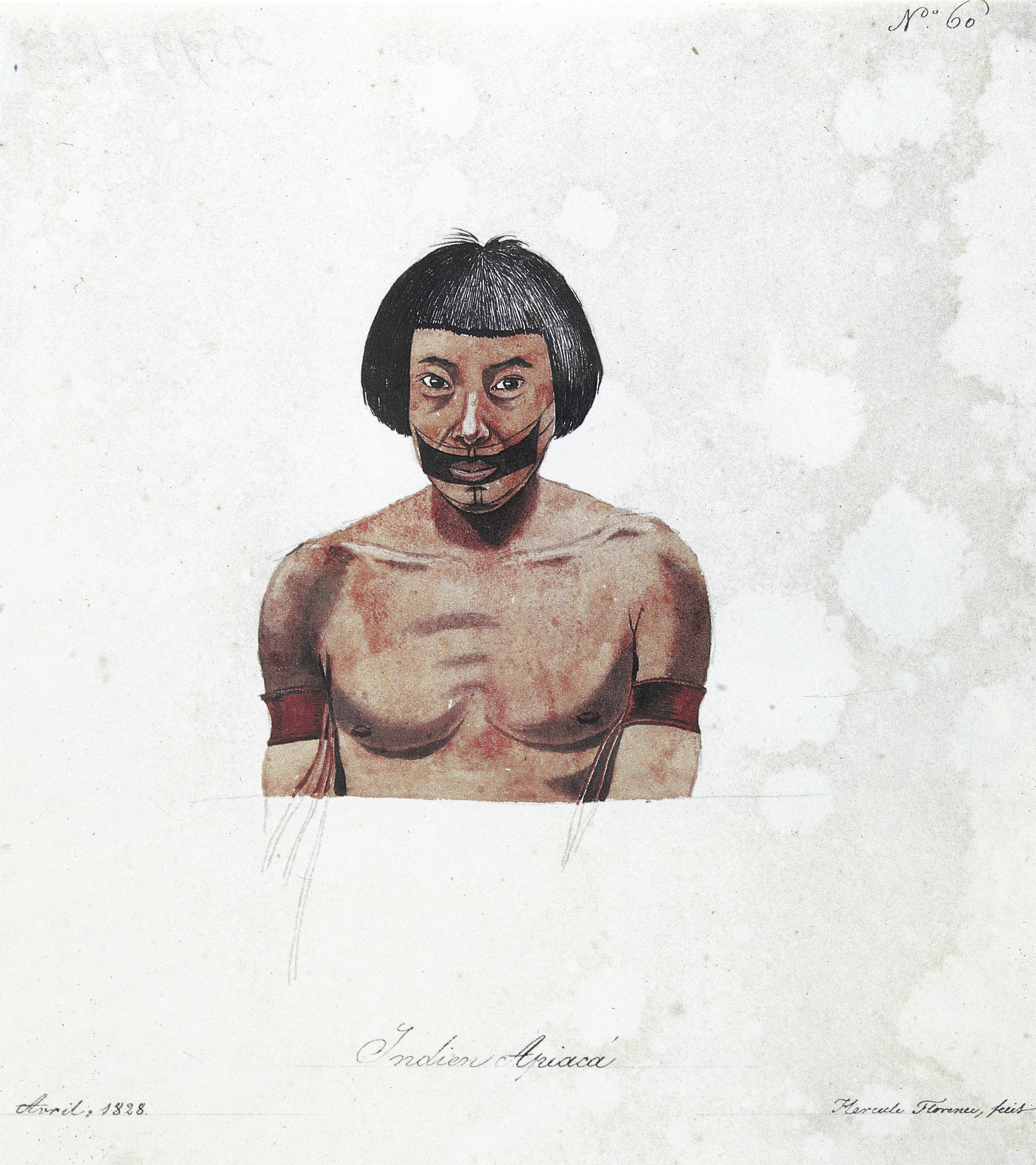
