= Harpalus metallinus =

Scientific classification
- Kingdom: Animalia
- Phylum: Arthropoda
- Class: Insecta
- Order: Coleoptera
- Suborder: Adephaga
- Family: Carabidae
- Genus: Harpalus
- Species: H. metallinus

Binomial name
- Harpalus metallinus Ménétries, 1836

Species of beetle

Harpalus metallinus is a species of ground beetle in the subfamily Harpalinae. It was described by Édouard Ménétries in 1836.
