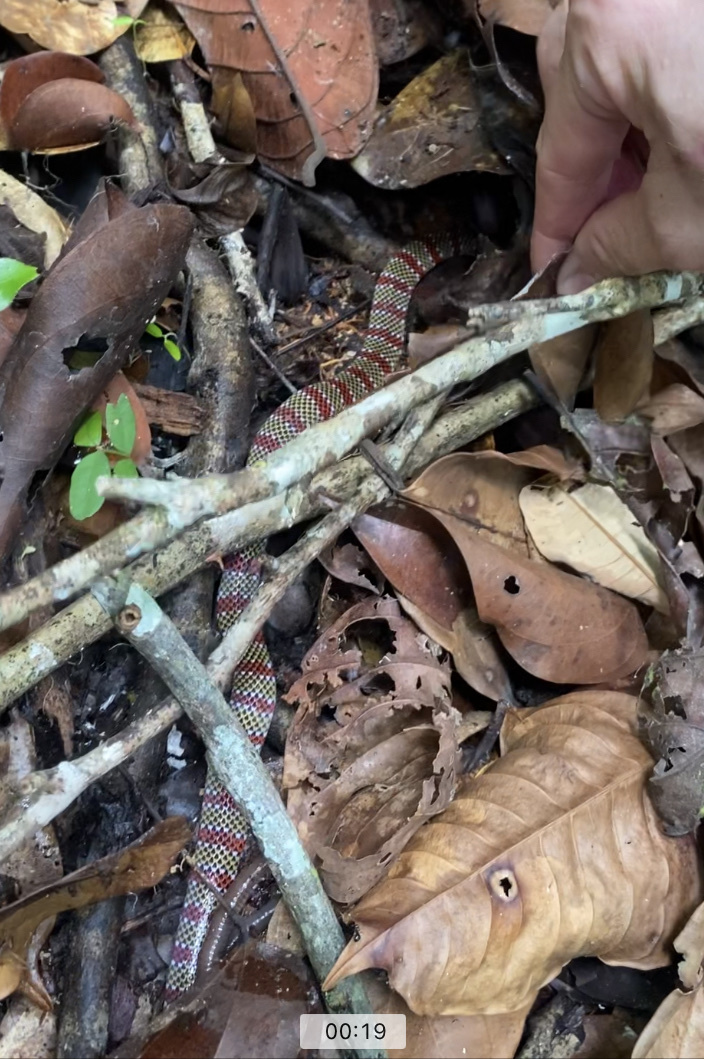
- Foraging in leaf litter near Iquitos, Peru

Conservation status
- Least Concern (IUCN 3.1)

Scientific classification
- Kingdom: Animalia
- Phylum: Chordata
- Class: Reptilia
- Order: Squamata
- Suborder: Serpentes
- Family: Elapidae
- Genus: Micrurus
- Species: M. langsdorffi

Binomial name
- Micrurus langsdorffi (Wagler, 1824)
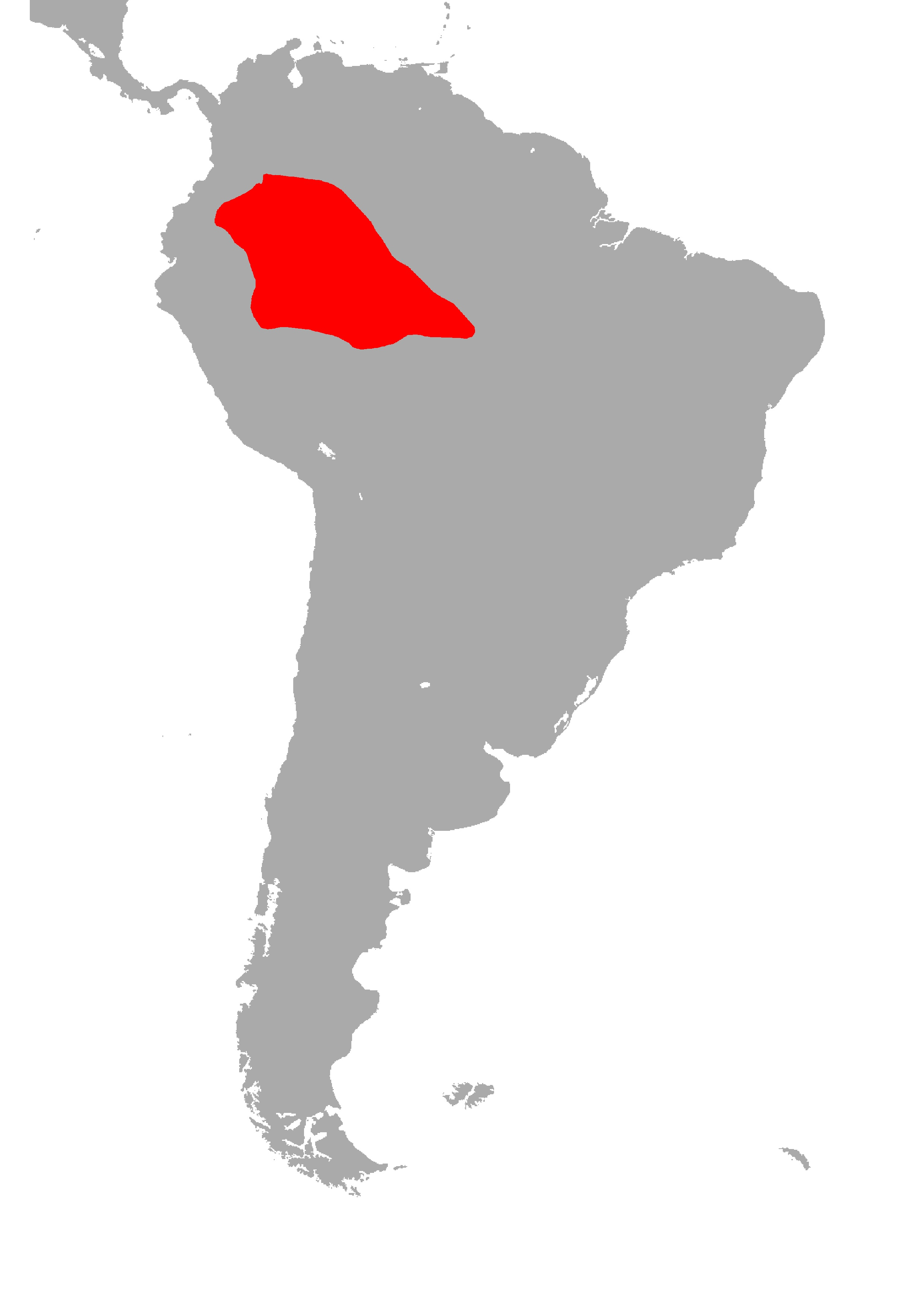

Synonyms
- Elaps langsdorffi Wagler, 1824; Elaps imperator Cope, 1868; Elaps batesi Günther, 1868; Micrurus mimosus Amaral, 1935

= Micrurus langsdorffi =

Species of snake

Micrurus langsdorffi, also known commonly as the confused coral snake and Langsdorff's coral snake, is a species of venomous snake in the family Elapidae. The species is native to northwestern South America.

== Local common names ==
Local common names for Micrurus langsdorffi include cobra coral confusa in Brazilian Portuguese, and coral confundida in South American Spanish.

== Etymology ==
The specific name, langsdorfii, is in honor of German naturalist Georg Heinrich von Langsdorff.

== Description ==
Medium-sized for the genus Micrurus, adults of Micrurus langsdorffi usually have a total length (tail included) of 45–60 cm (18–24 in). The maximum recorded total length is 77 cm (30 in).

The color pattern of M. langsdorffi is very variable. It is basically a combination of red, white (or yellow), and black rings, arranged singly (not in triads). However, some of the colors may be missing or replaced by brown or gray. Also, the black rings may not extend across the ventral scales, and the white rings may be reduced to a series of pearl-like dots.

== Geographic range ==
Micrurus langsdorffi is found in Brazil, Colombia, Ecuador, and Peru.

== Habitat ==
The preferred natural habitat of Micrurus langsdorffi is forest, at altitudes of 80–450 m (260–1,480 ft).

== Behavior ==
Micrurus langsdorffi is primarily terrestrial, but it has been observed swimming across rivers.

== Diet ==
Micrurus langsdorffi preys predominately upon snakes (ophiophagy). Prey items include blind snakes such as Amerotyphlops reticulatus and species of the subfamily Epictinae, as well as species of the family Colubridae.

== Reproduction ==
Micrurus langsdorffi is oviparous.
