= Peter Clausen (naturalist) =

Danish natural history collector

Peter Clausen (approximately 1801–1872), often misspelt as Peter Claussen, and also known as Pedro Claudio Clausen and Pedro Dinamarquez Clausen, was a Danish natural history collector born in Copenhagen, who was known for his work between 1834 and 1843. His birth and death dates are unclear, sometimes recorded as 1804-1855 or as 1801–1872. His botanical collections are present in many European herbaria. He sold animal fossils to the British Museum and the Jardin des Plantes in France. He later had an article about the geology of Minas Gerais published through the L'Académie Royale des Sciences, des Lettres et des Beaux-Arts de Belgique. He worked with Jules Paul Benjamin Delessert.

== Life ==
On account of fraud he emigrated to Brazil, and with Don Pedro I's army arrived in Rio de Janeiro. He at first enlisted as a common soldier and later lived as a peddler. During Argentine's Cisplatine War with Brazil between 1825 and 1828, he served as a spy. Later he lived as a merchant in the province of Cachoeira do Campo, in the State of Minas Gerais, becoming the owner of a farm in the northerly neighborhood of Curvelo, some days' journey north of Lagoa Santa.

On his great journey through the Brazilian countryside in 1833–35, he chanced to meet the Danish naturalist Peter Wilhelm Lund accompanied by the German botanist Ludwig Riedel in October 1834. There he used the name "Pedro Claudio Dinamarquez", and Lund stayed on Clausen farm 'Porteirinha' for about a week. This meeting proved a turning point in both Lund's and Clausen's lives. On the farm were caves in the limestone hills, and these were exploited by the local people for fertilizer. Later visits to these caves by Lund uncovered numerous fossil remains. The study of these linked Lund forever to inland Brazil. For commercial reasons Clausen's acquaintance with Lund turned him into a natural history collector, both of plants and fossil animals.

In 1843 he accompanied Francis de Castelnau on his South American expedition. After returning to Europe he began to suffer from mental problems and so was taken to a hospital in Dartford, London, where he died in 1855.

== See also ==
- List of caves in Brazil
