= Mexico and the Mexicans =

Mexico and the Mexicans (Spanish: México y los mexicanos) is an 1855 monograph by Christian Sartorius, illustrated by Johann Moritz Rugendas. It is considered part of the Costumbrismo movement, because of its romanticized realist depictions of nineteenth-century Mexican country life.

Sartorius' work was inspired by that of Prussian naturalist and geographer Alexander von Humboldt, whose travels and documentation of Latin America and Mexico were among the first 'scientific' European explorations of what was then known as New Spain.

Mexico and the Mexicans narrates the conditions of life for different social classes in cities such as Mexico, Córdoba, Veracruz, and Jalapa. In preparation for publication, the illustrator Moritz Rugendas created nearly 1,400 detailed illustrations, paintings, and diagrams of the materials covered in the book, but Sartorius ultimately included only 18 in the final publication.
