= Adrien Taunay the Younger =

French painter

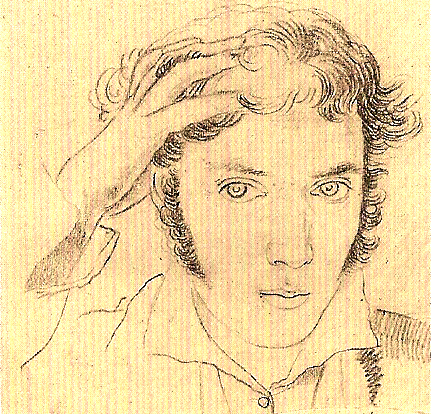
Self-portrait

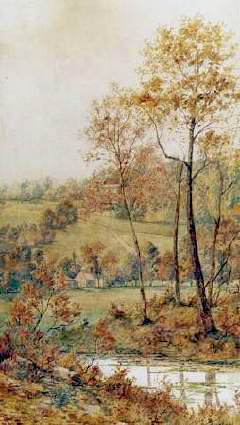
'Autumn Landscape' painting by Adrien Taunay the Younger

Adrien Taunay the Younger (1803 – 5 January 1828) was a French painter and draftsman.

He was born in Paris in 1803, the son of history and genre painter Nicolas-Antoine Taunay (1755–1830). Adrien moved to Rio de Janeiro in 1816, accompanying his father, who was a member of the French Artistic Mission. Adrien was the junior draftsman aboard the French vessel of exploration Uranie, commanded by Captain Louis de Freycinet. During the ship's 22-day stay in Hawaii in 1819, Adrien Taunay working with the official artist Jacques Arago (1790–1855), produced many portraits and natural history drawings. They depicted the local people and landscape at a time when Hawaii was becoming a whaling center and part of the trade route with China.

After completion of this voyage, Adrien returned to Rio de Janeiro in 1820, and devoted himself to the study of arts and languages. He succeeded Johann Moritz Rugendas (1802–1858), to the position of first draughtsman of the exhibition led by the Consul Georg Heinrich von Langsdorff (1774–1852), which between the years 1825 to 1829 navigated the rivers of the Brazilian states of São Paulo, Mato Grosso do Sul, Mato Grosso and Pará. After traveling for two years, they arrived in Cuiabá, where they remained for approximately a year. Langsdorff then decided to split the expedition into two groups, which, after following different routes, would meet in the city of Belém do Pará. The group consisting of Adrien Taunay and the botanist Ludwig Riedel (1791–1861) had the task of following the rivers Guaporé and Madeira. On this journey, they reached Vila Bela de Mato Grosso, in December 1827. After a number of trips around the settlements and having separated from Riedel, Adrien Taunay got lost in the forest. He finally managed to locate the bank of the Guaporé river, but drowned while trying to cross it in January 1828.

The Honolulu Museum of Art and the National Library of Australia are among the public collections holding works of Adrien Taunay the Younger.

== See also ==
- European and American voyages of scientific exploration
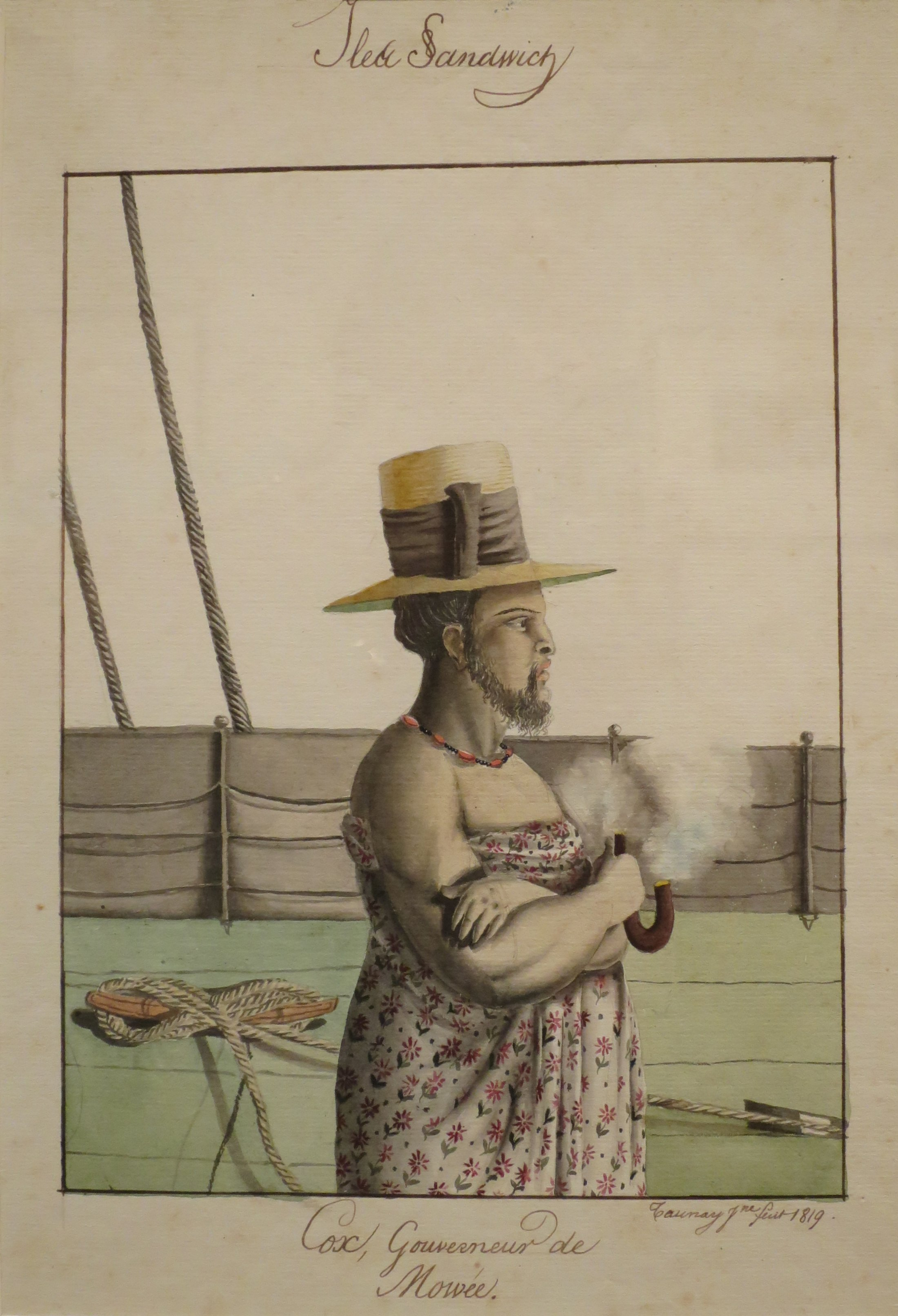
Governor Cox of Maui, ink and watercolor over graphite by Adrien Taunay the Younger, 1819, Honolulu Museum of Art

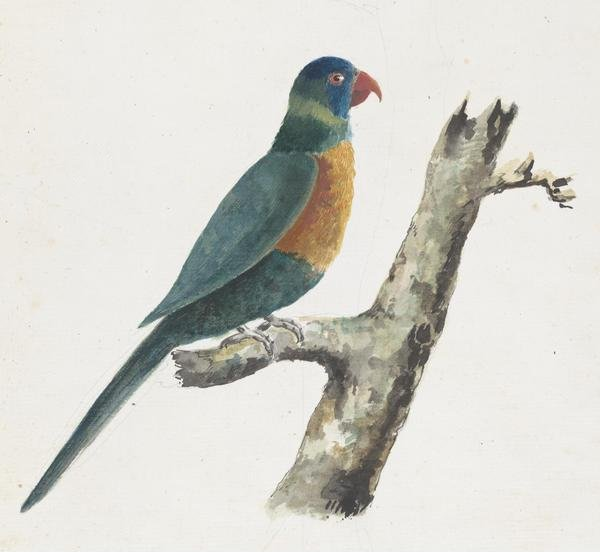
Green Parrot, watercolor painting by Adrien Taunay the Younger, c. 1819, National Library of Australia
