= Georg von Langsdorff =

German naturalist and explorer and Russian diplomat

Freiherr Georg Heinrich von Langsdorff
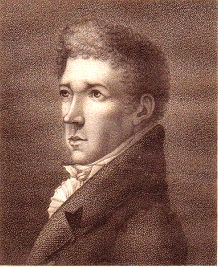
- Born: 8 April 1774; Wöllstein, Electoral Palatinate, Holy Roman Empire
- Died: 9 June 1852 (aged 78); Freiburg im Breisgau, Grand Duchy of Baden, German Confederation
- Scientific career
- Author abbrev. (botany): Langsd.

Georg Heinrich Freiherr von Langsdorff (8 April 1774 – 9 June 1852) was a German naturalist and explorer, as well as a Russian diplomat, better known by his Russian name, Grigori Ivanovich Langsdorf.

He was a naturalist and physician on the First Russian circumnavigation from 1803 to 1806. Later Langsdorff was nominated consul general of Russia in Rio de Janeiro, Brazil. From there he organized expeditions to Minas Gerais (1813 to 1820) and the Langsdorff Expedition to the Amazon rainforest, which lasted from 1825 to 1829.

== Life ==
Georg Heinrich Langsdorff was born in April 1774 at Wöllstein, in the Electoral Palatinate, Holy Roman Empire. He studied medicine and natural history at the University of Göttingen, Germany, under Johann Friedrich Blumenbach and graduated with a doctorate in medicine and surgery in 1797.

That same year he accompanied Christian August, Prince of Waldeck and Pyrmont, Field Marshal of the Portuguese land army, to Lisbon. However, after Prince Christian died in 1798, he set up a private medical practice, and subsequently accepted the post of surgeon to English troops in Portugal. After the Treaty of Amiens he visited London and Paris, and returned to Göttingen.

He was appointed a member and correspondent of the Russian Imperial Academy of Sciences on 29 January 1803. He requested to join the scientific crew of the First Russian voyage of circumnavigation but received a polite rejection letter; the expedition's ships would take on board the official naturalist at Copenhagen. The day he received the letter he left Göttingen and reached Copenhagen in seven days, where the Russian ships were still docked. He implored with ambassador to Japan Nikolai Rezanov, and supported by Captain Adam Johann von Krusenstern, his petition to join the expedition was granted.

=== Russian Voyage of Circumnavigation ===
The route of the first Russian circumnavigation

Langsdorff participated as a naturalist and physician in Krusenstern's Russian expedition from 1803 to 1805. On this journey he visited Falmouth in England, Tenerife in the Canary Islands, Santa Catarina Island in Brazil, Nuku Hiva, the Hawaiian Islands, Kamchatka and Japan.

When the expedition returned to Kamchatka he left with ambassador Nikolai Rezanov and headed to the northwest coast of North America. He explored the Aleutians, Kodiak and Sitka. At Sitka he met and befriended the American maritime fur trader John DeWolf, who sold the RAC his ship Juno. Langsdorff and Rezanov traveled sailed Juno to San Francisco to acquire food for Sitka. From Sitka, Langsdorff and DeWolf sailed to Petropavlovsk, then Okhotsk. From there both traveled overland across Siberia separately making their way to Saint Petersburg, where Langsdorff arrived in 1808.

He encountered various problems on his journey. For example, in Brazil the humidity caused the botanical samples to rot, and ants came and ate his insect collections. On his way back to Saint Petersburg he lost part of his herbarium collection in the Lena between Yakutsk and Irkutsk. However he was able to publish his findings in books such as Plantes recueilles pendant le voyage des Russes autour du monde: expédition dirigée par M. de Krusenstern. (Plants collected during the Russians' voyage around the world: expedition led by Mr. Krusenstern), published in 1810.

== Brazil ==
In 1813 Langsdorff was nominated consul general of Russia in Rio de Janeiro, Brazil. He acquired a farm (named "Mandioca", or manioc) in the north of Rio and collected plants, animals and minerals. He hosted and entertained foreign naturalists and scientists, such as Johann Baptist von Spix (1781–1826) and Carl Friedrich Philipp von Martius (1794–1868), and explored the flora, fauna and geography of the province of Minas Gerais with French naturalist Augustin Saint-Hilaire from 1813 to 1820.

=== The Langsdorff Expedition ===
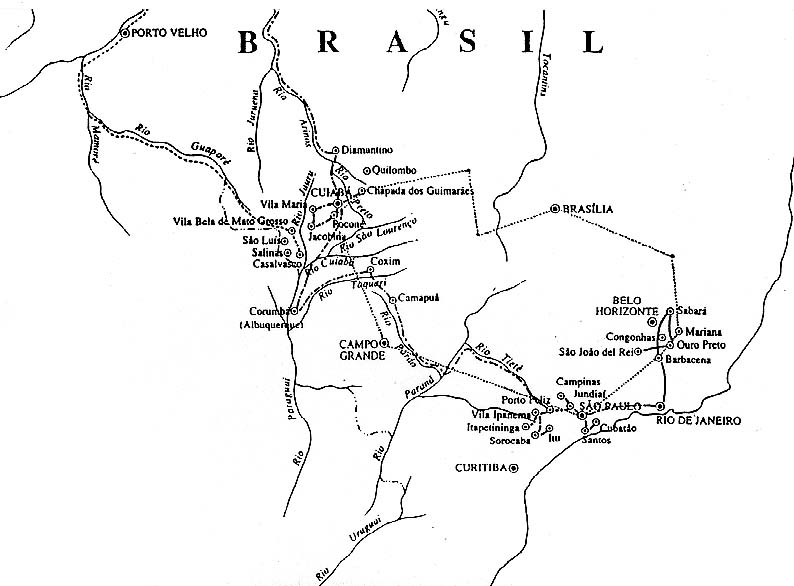
Chart of the Langsdorff expedition itenerary in Brazil

In 1821 he proposed to the Tsar Alexander I and to the Academy of Sciences to lead an ambitious exploratory and scientific expedition from São Paulo to Pará, in the Amazon, via a fluvial route. In March 1822, he returned to Rio in the company of scientists Édouard Ménétries (1802–1861), Ludwig Riedel (1761–1861), Christian Hasse and Nester Rubtsov (1799–1874), who would take care of zoological, botanical, astronomical and cartographical observations during the expedition. With the aim of illustrating and documenting his findings, the Baron hired painters Hércules Florence, Johann Moritz Rugendas and Adrien Taunay. The inventor of the bicycle Karl von Drais was also a participant in the expedition.

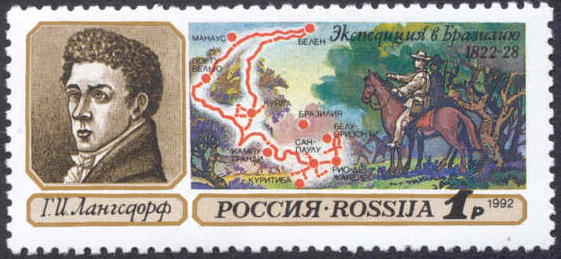
Langsdorff expedition commemorated on a 1992 stamp of Russia

After extensive preparations, the Langsdorff Expedition departed with 40 people and 7 boats from Porto Feliz, by the Tietê River on 22 June 1826 and reached Cuiabá, in Mato Grosso on 30 January 1827. The expedition was then divided into two groups: the first one, with Langsdorff and Florence, was able to reach Santarém on the Amazon River on 1 July 1828, with enormous difficulties and suffering. Most of the members of the expedition became ill with tropical fevers (most probably yellow fever), including the Baron de Langsdorff. As a consequence of the febrile attacks, he became insane at the Juruena River in May 1828. Adrien Taunay died by drowning in the Guaporé River and Rugendas abandoned the expedition before its fluvial phase. Therefore, only Florence remained during the whole expedition. The expedition was joined again in Belém and returned by ship to Rio de Janeiro, arriving on 13 March 1829, almost three years and 6,000 km after its departure.

Huge scientific collections were deposited into Kunstkamera and later formed basis for South American collections of Russian museums. However, the rich scientific records of the expedition, comprising many descriptions and discoveries in zoology, botany, mineralogy, medicine, linguistics and ethnography, that were sent to Saint Petersburg by the expedition, were not published and were lost in the archives for a century. They were found again by Soviet researchers in funds of the USSR Academy of Sciences archive in 1930. Due to the travel's hardships, Langsdorff team was unable to collect many biological specimens or study them in detail, so most of their account is geographic and ethnographic, being particularly interesting on the many indigenous people of Brazil they met, many of which became extinct. Today, a large part of the material has been recovered and is in the Ethographic Museum, the Zoological Museum and in the repositories of the Academy of Sciences of St. Petersburg.

Langsdorff returned to Europe shortly after the Langsdorff Expedition to the Amazon, and died in Freiburg, Germany, of typhus, in 1852.

A recent study found that Langsdorff has 1,500 descendants in Brazil, among them the most famous is Luma de Oliveira, a Brazilian carnival queen.

== Legacy ==
A species of venomous South American coral snake, Micrurus langsdorffi, is named in his honor.

The fish Carassius langsdorfii Temminck & Schlegel 1846 is named after him.

== Media ==
A film documentary, featuring Adriana Florence, a great-great-granddaughter of Hércules Florence living in Campinas, Brazil, has been made by the Discovery Channel and retraces part of the expedition's itinerary. It also visited St. Petersburg's Langsdorff museum collections. The director was Mauricio Dias.

== See also ==
- European and American voyages of scientific exploration

== Sources ==
- Barman, Roderick J. (1971). "The Forgotten Journey: Georg Heinrich Langsdorff and the Russian Imperial Scientific Expedition to Brazil, 1821–1829". Terrae Incognitae. 3 (1): 67–96. doi:10.1179/tin.1971.3.1.67.
- Beidleman, Richard G. (2006). California's Frontier Naturalists. University of California Press. pp. 42–47.
- Daum, Andreas W.: German Naturalists in the Pacific around 1800: Entanglement, Autonomy, and a Transnational Culture of Expertise. In: Explorations and Entanglements: Germans in Pacific Worlds from the Early Modern Period to World War I, ed. Hartmut Berghoff et al. New York, Berghahn Books, 2019, 70‒102.
- McKelvey, Susan Delano (1955). Botanical exploration of the trans-Mississippi West, 1790-1850. Arnold Arboretum of Harvard University. pp. 86–100.
- Langsdorff, G. H. von. Voyages and Travels in Various Parts of the World, during the Years 1803, 1804, 1805, 1806, and 1807. Illustrated by Engravings from Original Drawings. London: Printed for Henry Colburn and Sold by George Goldie, Edinburgh; and John Cumming, Dublin, 181. (hdl:2027/nyp.33433000405047)
- Diaries of Russian Complex Academic Expedition into Brazil in 1824-1826 Under Leadership of Academician G. I. Langsdorff (in Russian, Russian title: Дневник русской комплексной академической экспедиции в Бразилию в 1824-1826 гг. под началом академика Г. И. Лангсдорфа). Moscow: Nauka, 1995. Available online (scroll down the page)
