= Ludwig Riedel =

German botanist (1790–1861)

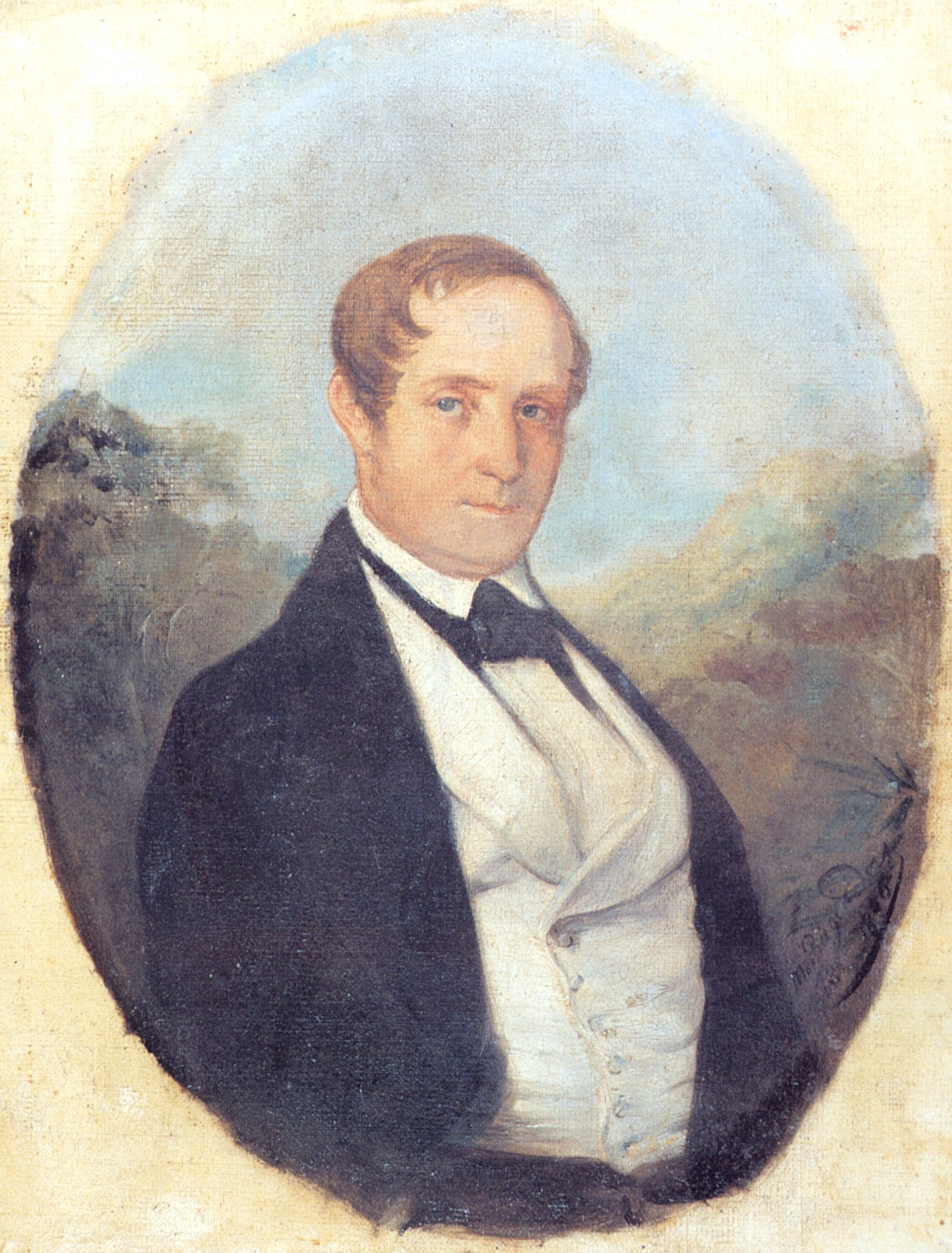
Ludwig Riedel at age 56, 1846

Ludwig Riedel (2 March 1790, Berlin, Germany – 6 August 1861, Rio de Janeiro, Brazil) was a German botanist. Riedel described relatively few species himself, but collected hundreds of new species, many named after him. The genus Riedelia (Ericaceae) was named for him by Meisner.

== Biography ==
Riedel came to Brazil in 1821, invited to participate in the expedition organized by the German-Russian physician, naturalist, ethnographer and explorer Baron von Langsdorff. From 1821 to 1830 and from 1831 to 1836, Riedel worked in Brazil collecting plants for the Botanical Garden of Saint Petersburg. In 1836 he accepted a permanent position in the National Museum of Rio de Janeiro, being the first foreigner with a permanent post in the museum. He founded and directed the department of botany and the Botanical Garden attached to it (Horto Florestal) until 1858. Rudolph Friedrich Hohenacker edited and distributed specimens collected by Riedel in Brazil as exsiccata-like series entitled Riedel pl. Brasiliae. Ed. R. F. Hohenacker.

== Legacy ==
Ludwig Riedel's name is well known in Rio de Janeiro. Once he was director of the Public Park, the National Museum, and head of the Botanical Garden at the time of the empire.

== See also ==
- IPNI under riedelii, riedeliana and riedelianum
