= Édouard Ménétries =

French entomologist, zoologist, and herpetologist

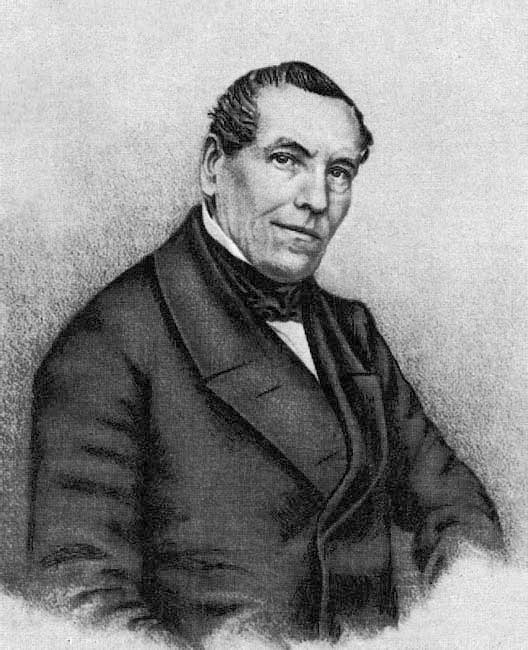
- Born: 2 October 1802; Paris, France
- Died: 10 April 1861 (aged 58); St Petersburg, Russia
- Scientific career
- Fields: entomology
- Author abbrev. (zoology): Ménétries

Édouard Ménétries (French pronunciation: [edwaʁ menetʁi]; Paris, France, 2 October 1802 – St. Petersburg, Russian Empire, 10 April 1861) was a French entomologist, zoologist, and herpetologist. He is best known as the founder of the Russian Entomological Society.

Ménétries was born in Paris, and became a student of Georges Cuvier and Pierre André Latreille. On their recommendation he was chosen as the zoologist on a Russian expedition to Brazil in 1822, led by Baron von Langsdorff. On his return he was appointed curator of the Zoological Collection at St Petersburg. In 1829 he was sent by the Tsar on an exploratory trip to the Caucasus.

Ménétries was an authority on Lepidoptera and Coleoptera but also worked on other orders. Most of his named species are from Russia and Siberia but at the museum he was able to study insects from other parts of the world. Two such collections were those made during the expeditions of Alexander von Middendorf (1842–1845) and Leopold von Schrenck (1853–1857) to California and Alaska as well as Siberia. His collection is in the Museum of the St. Petersburg Academy.

In the field of herpetology he described several new species of reptiles and amphibians.

== Biography ==
=== His first steps ===
Menetries, was born in Paris. In his youth he was a student of Georges Cuvier and a "father of entomology" Pierre André Latreille. On their recommendation he participated in 1821–1825 in the expedition of the Russian Academician G.I. Langsdorff to Brazil where he acquired vast experience of field research and wrote a number of papers on zoology. After returning from Brazil he was invited to St Petersburg, where he arrived in 1826 and was enrolled on the staff of the Kunstkammer in the position of curator of the zoological collections. He was provided an apartment at government expense and a salary of 2500 roubles per year.

=== Expedition to the Caucasus ===
In Russia, his first and longest trip in 1829–1830 was to the Caucasus, which was not pacified yet. That academic expedition was organized on the initiative of General Emmanuel, member of the Academy, who was the army commander in the Caucasus. The expedition included physicist A.Ya. Kupfer, geographer E.F. Lents and botanist K.A. Meyer. Menetries was in charge of the zoological part. Through Moscow, Rostov, and Stavropol participants of the expedition arrived at the fortification Kamennyi Most on the Malka River, where the staff of General Emmanuel was situated.

Emmanuel with his son and several more people joined them. Under the protection of 650 soldiers, 350 Cossacks and two cannons, the party moved to Elbrus and made a camp at the foot of the mountain. On 9 (21) July two days of climbing of Elbrus were undertaken. On the first day the explorers reached the boundary of eternal snow and spent the night there. On the second day they started storming the peak.

They did not succeed in climbing it. When they reached an altitude of 4,700 meters, the sun had risen and the snow cover partly melted, which made further expedition impossible. Only one guide, Kabardian Kilar Khashirov, reached the peak. Then for one month the expedition examined the Elbrus area, collecting great quantities of scientific material. Afterwards they returned to Pyatigorsk. There the participants received academic instruction according to which Lenz, Meier, and Menetries were to continue their trip for studying the Caspian coast up to the Persian boundary.

At the end of August they left Pyatigorsk and arrived in fortress Groznaya (now Grozny) and from there departed at the end of October with a Cossack escort to Khasavyurt, crossed Sulak, travelled to the Caspian coast through Derbent and Kuba, and arrived in Baku on 9 (21) December. In winter they examined mud volcanoes and discharges of oil and gas in the Apsheron Peninsula. On 27 April (9 May), Menetries and Meier moved from Baku southwards through Salyany, the southern part of Mugan steppe, and the coast of Kyzyl-Agach Bay. After 20 days, they arrived in Lenkoran.

They examined lowland and foothill forests with extremely interesting fauna and flora and then made a month-long trip to the mountains near Zuvand Depression, where they collected abundant entomological materials. When they returned to Lenkoran at the end of June, a cholera epidemic raged through the city and they quickly moved to Baku and then to Kuba from where they climbed the slopes of the mountains Shahdagh and Beshbarmak up to the subalpine zone. In Kuba they encountered a cholera epidemic again. They moved to Pyatigorsk and departed from there in the middle of October. But because of impassable roads and cholera quarantines they returned to St. Petersburg at the end of December.

In 1831, Menetries published "The Annotated Catalogue of Zoological Objects Collected during the Journey to the Caucasus to the Boundaries with Persia". That first large scientific work dealing with the Caucasian fauna contained descriptions of several hundred species of Caucasian insects, mainly beetles and butterflies; up till the present it retains its significance as a source of study of animals of the Caucasus.

=== Curator for the Zoological Museum ===
In St. Petersburg, Menetries, as the new curator. began reorganizing the collections. Before then the method of setting collections in the Kunstkammer was totally unscientific.

The collections were exhibited in cases with glass covers grouped in such a way that a large and colourful insect, a butterfly or a beetle was placed in the centre and different species were arranged around it radially, symmetrically where possible. At the centre, each radius began with a small insect which was followed by larger insects so that the case was filled completely. Set in such a manner the collection had no scientific value, since even orders were mixed in a quaint way, reflecting the aesthetic ideas of the person who assembled the collection.

No labels with identifications of insects were applied: information about their origin was usually missing. Menetries divided the collection by order, identified the material where possible and arranged the collection in systematic order. A large portion of material that had no labels, and suffered from pests and mould, was disposed of. When the Zoological Museum of the Academy of Sciences was officially opened in 1832 Menetries was designated Curator of its entomological collections. He held that position up to the end of his life.

The new collection at the Zoological Museum was based upon specimens collected by Menetries in Brazil, in the Caucasus. Later the rich collection of Arvid David Hummel that consisted mostly of insects from St. Petersburg province, and a small but interesting collection from the vicinity of Irkutsk, were added to the museum. It was not easy for Menetries to live and work. His salary was growing slower than the cost of living and it was hardly possible to maintain his family with that salary. Menetries earned additional money by teaching classes at the Smolny Institute (a college for girls of noble origin) and other colleges.

In 1855 he was elected Corresponding Member of the Academy of Sciences, but at that time it provided no advantage in terms of material well-being, and he didn't even have an assistant at the museum. In the 1830s through the 1850s vast zoological collections were received by the museum from different regions of the Russian Empire, including Russian America, and through collection exchanges with foreign Museums, but there weren't enough cabinets and cases. Under such difficult conditions Menetries had done a lot primarily on beetles and butterflies.

He studied fauna of European Russia and of Siberia; published one of the first works on fauna of Kazakhstan based on the collections of the famous traveller S. Karelin (great grandfather of the poet Alexander Blok). He examined collections of A. Leman, a doctor and naturalist who was sent on a Russian political mission to Khiva and Bukhara (nearly unstudied at that time), and who died on the way back from Central Asia.

Thus, foundations of knowledge on entomofauna of these areas were laid and collections were established on which this knowledge rested. In order to cope with the huge amount of technical work and to have time for investigations Menetries sought the assistance of a small group of St. Petersburg amateurs in entomology (primarily butterfly and beetle collectors).

They prepared and labeled insects that were included into the collection. For that service they received duplicate specimens. Negative aspects of this practice very soon became apparent. Some amateurs took advantage of Menetries' reliance. A particularly negative role was played by V.I. Motschulsky starting in the mid-1850s. This very energetic man, colonel of the General Staff, owner of a huge collection and author of numerous works on systematics of beetles and some on other insects suggested that he would identify and bring into order the Coleoptera collection.

He then handled the collection of the Museum as if it had been his own: he took home whole parcels of material, kept the most interesting specimens, used duplicates for exchange purposes, and returned to the museum only what was left. His example was followed by other collectors who examined Hymenoptera, Heteroptera and other groups.

At the end of his life Menetries studied mostly butterflies, which are therefore in a better state of preservation than other insect orders. When he died at the beginning of 1861 his successor, A.F. Moravits, had to make much effort to bring the collection into order and regulate access to it. Relations with Motschulsky were ended. He brought his collection to Moscow; after his death the collection was deposited at the Zoological Museum of the Moscow University.

=== Creation of the Russian Entomological Society ===
The circle of amateur entomologists around Menetries had played a positive role in the development of entomology in Russia. It was the core of the Russian (from 1930 through 1992 All-Union) Entomological Society. The first project of the society arose in the beginning of 1848, but as has been stated in the paper commemorating the 50th anniversary of the Society (1910). "For circumstances of that time not only was the fulfillment of that idea to be postponed, but even private meetings were to be ceased".

This happened because Nicholas I, frightened by the revolutionary movement of 1848 in Europe, was afraid of even scientific societies and meetings. It was not until after his death that movement for the organization of the society was started at the reign of Alexander II, who was more liberal, and with the assistance of intelligent and well-educated grand princess Elena Pavlovna, widow of Mikhail Pavlovich, uncle of Alexander II.

In 1859 permission was granted. The organizing meeting of the Russian Entomological Society took place on 25 February 1860 in the large official apartment of general K. Manderstern, Superintendent of the Peter-and-Paul Fortress. His son, colonel of the Guards, was among the organizers of the society. The meeting was attended by 30 people including Academicians Johann Friedrich von Brandt, Karl Ernst von Baer (elected the first President of the Russian Entomological Society) and Alexander von Middendorff the famous explorer and researcher of Siberia. Seven founders of the society were officers. Menetries, who was seriously ill, could not attend the meeting. He died a year later on 10 April 1861. His contribution in the development of entomology in Russia should not be forgotten.

== Publications ==
Partial List

- Catalogue raisonné des objets de zoologie recueillis dans un voyage au Caucase et jusqu'aux frontières de la Perse. St.-Pétersbourg, 271 p.(1832)
- Sur un nouveau genre de lépidoptère nocturne de la Russie. Bull. phys. mat. Acad. Péters., t. 9, No. 195, pp. 40–43(1842)
- Lépidoptères de la Sibérie orientale et en particulier des rives de l'Amour. Bull. Acad. Sci. St. Pétersb., T. 17, p. 212–221*(1859)
- Sur quelques Lépidoptères du gouvernement de Jakoutsk. Bull. Acad. Sci. St.Pétersb., t. 17, pp. 494–500 (1859)
- Descriptions de nouvelles espèces de Lépidoptères de la collection de l'Académie impériale des Sciences. 3-ème et dernière partie in: Ménétriès, E. Enumeratio corporum animalium Musei Imp. Acad. Sci. etc. Petropolitane. Pars 3, Lep. Heterocera. St.-Pétersbourg, pp. 145–161, t. 15–18 (1863).

== Fontoj ==
- Nekrutenko-Yu, P.; Kerzhner, I. M. 1986 On the species and varieties of Parnassius (Lepidoptera Papilionidae) established by E. Menetries in the book by J. Siemaschko Russkaya Fauna. Entomologicheskoe Obozrenie 65(4): pp. 769–779
