= Phytoecia pubescens =

Scientific classification
- Kingdom: Animalia
- Phylum: Arthropoda
- Class: Insecta
- Order: Coleoptera
- Suborder: Polyphaga
- Infraorder: Cucujiformia
- Family: Cerambycidae
- Genus: Phytoecia
- Species: P. pubescens

Binomial name
- Phytoecia pubescens Pic, 1895

Synonyms
- Phytoecia manicata Reiche & Saulcy, 1858; Phytoecia manicata m. glaphyra K. Daniel, 1906; Phytoecia manicata m. pubescens Pic, 1895

Species of beetle

Phytoecia pubescens is a species of beetle in the family Cerambycidae. It was described by Maurice Pic in 1895, originally under the species Phytoecia manicata. It is known from Greece, Bulgaria, Croatia, Bosnia and Herzegovina, and Macedonia.
