= Ataxia alboscutellata =

Scientific classification
- Domain: Eukaryota
- Kingdom: Animalia
- Phylum: Arthropoda
- Class: Insecta
- Order: Coleoptera
- Suborder: Polyphaga
- Infraorder: Cucujiformia
- Family: Cerambycidae
- Tribe: Pteropliini
- Genus: Ataxia
- Species: A. alboscutellata

Binomial name
- Ataxia alboscutellata Fisher, 1926

Species of beetle

Ataxia alboscutellata is a species of beetle in the family Cerambycidae. It was described by Warren Samuel Fisher in 1926. It is known from the Virgin Islands, Cuba and Puerto Rico.
