= Egesina bakeri =

Scientific classification
- Kingdom: Animalia
- Phylum: Arthropoda
- Class: Insecta
- Order: Coleoptera
- Suborder: Polyphaga
- Infraorder: Cucujiformia
- Family: Cerambycidae
- Genus: Egesina
- Species: E. bakeri

Binomial name
- Egesina bakeri (Fisher, 1925)

Synonyms
- Platyzeargyra bakeri Fisher, 1925

Species of beetle

Egesina bakeri is a species of beetle in the family Cerambycidae. It was described by Warren Samuel Fisher in 1925. It is known from Borneo.
