= Egesina javana =

Scientific classification
- Domain: Eukaryota
- Kingdom: Animalia
- Phylum: Arthropoda
- Class: Insecta
- Order: Coleoptera
- Suborder: Polyphaga
- Infraorder: Cucujiformia
- Family: Cerambycidae
- Tribe: Pteropliini
- Genus: Egesina
- Species: E. javana

Binomial name
- Egesina javana (Fisher, 1934)

Species of beetle

Egesina javana is a species of beetle in the family Cerambycidae. It was described by Warren Samuel Fisher in 1934.
