= Egesina fusca =

Scientific classification
- Domain: Eukaryota
- Kingdom: Animalia
- Phylum: Arthropoda
- Class: Insecta
- Order: Coleoptera
- Suborder: Polyphaga
- Infraorder: Cucujiformia
- Family: Cerambycidae
- Tribe: Pteropliini
- Genus: Egesina
- Species: E. fusca

Binomial name
- Egesina fusca (Fisher, 1925)

Synonyms
- Neoegesina fusca Fisher, 1925

Species of beetle

Egesina fusca is a species of beetle in the family Cerambycidae. It was described by Warren Samuel Fisher in 1925.

== Subspecies ==
- Egesina fusca fusca (Fisher, 1925)
- Egesina fusca javicola Breuning, 1963
