= Dorcadion albanicum =

Scientific classification
- Kingdom: Animalia
- Phylum: Arthropoda
- Clade: Pancrustacea
- Class: Insecta
- Order: Coleoptera
- Suborder: Polyphaga
- Infraorder: Cucujiformia
- Family: Cerambycidae
- Genus: Dorcadion
- Species: D. albanicum

Binomial name
- Dorcadion albanicum Heyrovsky, 1934

Synonyms
- Pedestredorcadion albanicum (Heyrovský, 1934)

Species of beetle

Dorcadion albanicum is a species of beetle in the family Cerambycidae. It was described by Heyrovsky in 1934. It is known from Albania.
