= Egesina elegans =

Scientific classification
- Domain: Eukaryota
- Kingdom: Animalia
- Phylum: Arthropoda
- Class: Insecta
- Order: Coleoptera
- Suborder: Polyphaga
- Infraorder: Cucujiformia
- Family: Cerambycidae
- Tribe: Pteropliini
- Genus: Egesina
- Species: E. elegans

Binomial name
- Egesina elegans (Fisher, 1925)

Synonyms
- Callienispia elegans Fisher, 1925

Species of beetle

Egesina elegans is a species of longhorn beetles of the subfamily Lamiinae.
