= Acalolepta unicolor =

Scientific classification
- Kingdom: Animalia
- Phylum: Arthropoda
- Class: Insecta
- Order: Coleoptera
- Suborder: Polyphaga
- Infraorder: Cucujiformia
- Family: Cerambycidae
- Genus: Acalolepta
- Species: A. unicolor

Binomial name
- Acalolepta unicolor (Fisher, 1935)

Synonyms
- Orsidis unicolor Fisher, 1935

Species of beetle

Acalolepta unicolor is a species of beetle in the family Cerambycidae. It was described by Warren Samuel Fisher in 1935. It is known from Borneo.
