= Dystasia cristata =

Scientific classification
- Domain: Eukaryota
- Kingdom: Animalia
- Phylum: Arthropoda
- Class: Insecta
- Order: Coleoptera
- Suborder: Polyphaga
- Infraorder: Cucujiformia
- Family: Cerambycidae
- Tribe: Pteropliini
- Genus: Dystasia
- Species: D. cristata

Binomial name
- Dystasia cristata Fisher, 1933

Species of beetle

Dystasia cristata is a species of beetle in the family Cerambycidae. It was described by Warren Samuel Fisher in 1933.
