= Glenea borneensis =

Scientific classification
- Kingdom: Animalia
- Phylum: Arthropoda
- Class: Insecta
- Order: Coleoptera
- Suborder: Polyphaga
- Infraorder: Cucujiformia
- Family: Cerambycidae
- Genus: Glenea
- Species: G. borneensis

Binomial name
- Glenea borneensis Fisher, 1935

Species of beetle

Glenea borneensis is a species of beetle in the family Cerambycidae. It was described by Warren Samuel Fisher in 1935. It is known from Borneo.
