= Egesina varia =

Scientific classification
- Kingdom: Animalia
- Phylum: Arthropoda
- Class: Insecta
- Order: Coleoptera
- Suborder: Polyphaga
- Infraorder: Cucujiformia
- Family: Cerambycidae
- Genus: Egesina
- Species: E. varia

Binomial name
- Egesina varia (Fisher, 1925)

Synonyms
- Neoegesina varia Fisher, 1925

Species of beetle

Egesina varia is a species of beetle in the family Cerambycidae. It was described by Warren Samuel Fisher in 1925. It is known from Borneo.
