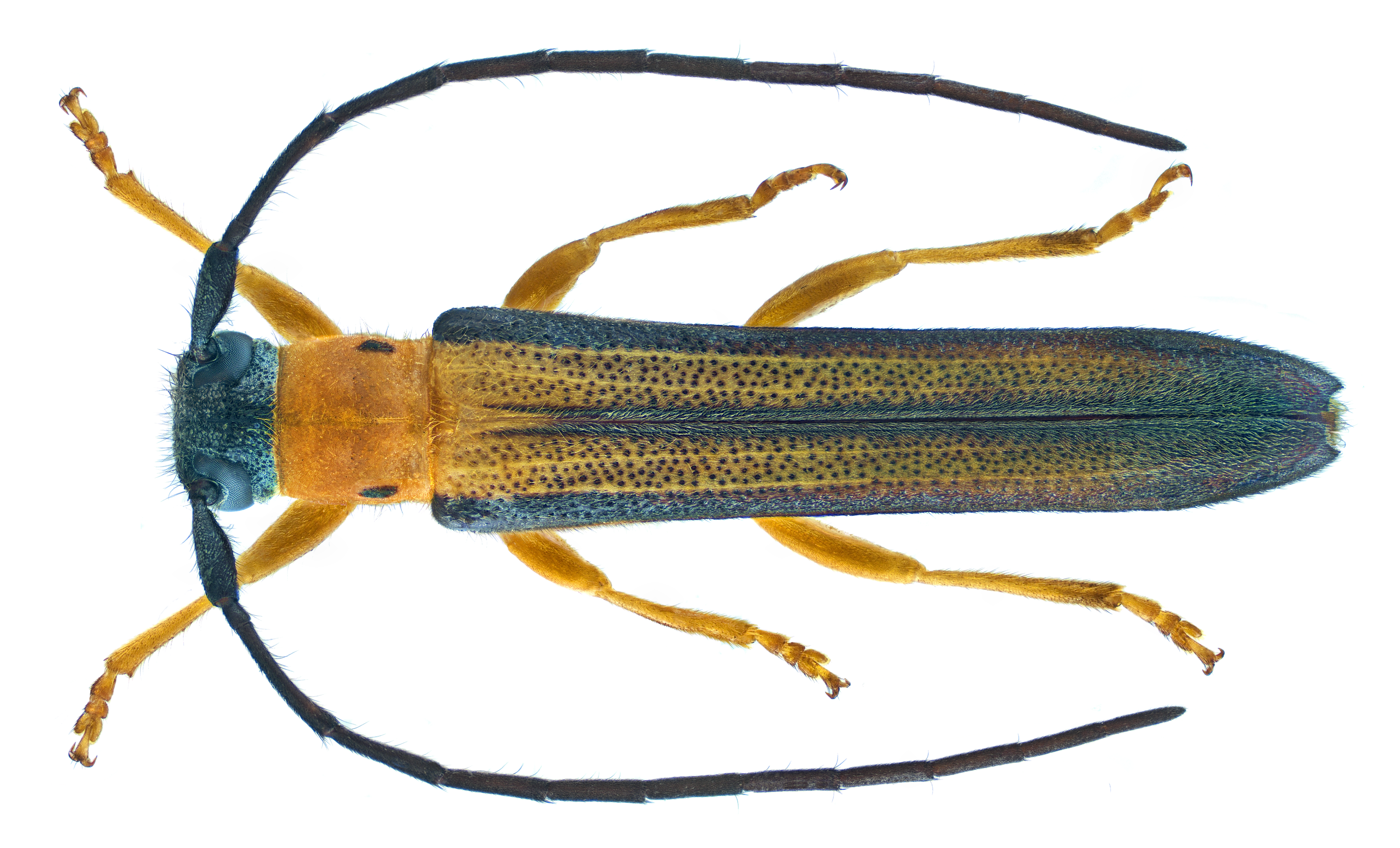

Scientific classification
- Kingdom: Animalia
- Phylum: Arthropoda
- Class: Insecta
- Order: Coleoptera
- Suborder: Polyphaga
- Infraorder: Cucujiformia
- Family: Cerambycidae
- Genus: Oberea
- Species: O. heyrovskyi

Binomial name
- Oberea heyrovskyi Pic, 1927

= Oberea heyrovskyi =

Species of beetle

Oberea heyrovskyi is a species of beetle in the family Cerambycidae. It was described by Maurice Pic in 1927. It is named after Leopold Heyrovský.
