= Dorcadion ossae =

Scientific classification
- Kingdom: Animalia
- Phylum: Arthropoda
- Clade: Pancrustacea
- Class: Insecta
- Order: Coleoptera
- Suborder: Polyphaga
- Infraorder: Cucujiformia
- Family: Cerambycidae
- Genus: Dorcadion
- Species: D. ossae

Binomial name
- Dorcadion ossae Heyrovsky, 1941

Synonyms
- Dorcadion ossaum Meschnigg, 1947; Pedestredorcadion ossae (Heyrovský) Sama, 2002

Species of beetle

Dorcadion ossae is a species of beetle in the family Cerambycidae. It was described by Heyrovský in 1941. It is known from Greece.
