= Pseudestoloides costaricensis =

Scientific classification
- Kingdom: Animalia
- Phylum: Arthropoda
- Class: Insecta
- Order: Coleoptera
- Suborder: Polyphaga
- Infraorder: Cucujiformia
- Family: Cerambycidae
- Genus: Pseudestoloides
- Species: P. costaricensis

Binomial name
- Pseudestoloides costaricensis Breuning & Heyrovsky, 1961

Species of beetle

Pseudestoloides costaricensis is a species of beetle in the family Cerambycidae. It was described by Stephan von Breuning and Heyrovsky in 1961. It is known from Costa Rica.
