= Dorcadion obenbergeri =

Scientific classification
- Kingdom: Animalia
- Phylum: Arthropoda
- Clade: Pancrustacea
- Class: Insecta
- Order: Coleoptera
- Suborder: Polyphaga
- Infraorder: Cucujiformia
- Family: Cerambycidae
- Genus: Dorcadion
- Species: D. obenbergeri

Binomial name
- Dorcadion obenbergeri Heyrovsky, 1940

Synonyms
- Dorcadion ljubetense obenbergeri Heyrovsky, 1940; Dorcadion ljubetense marani Heyrovsky, 1940; Pedestredorcadion obenbergeri (Heyrovský) Sama, 2002

Species of beetle

Dorcadion obenbergeri is a species of beetle in the family Cerambycidae. It was described by Leopold Heyrovský in 1940. It is known from Greece.
