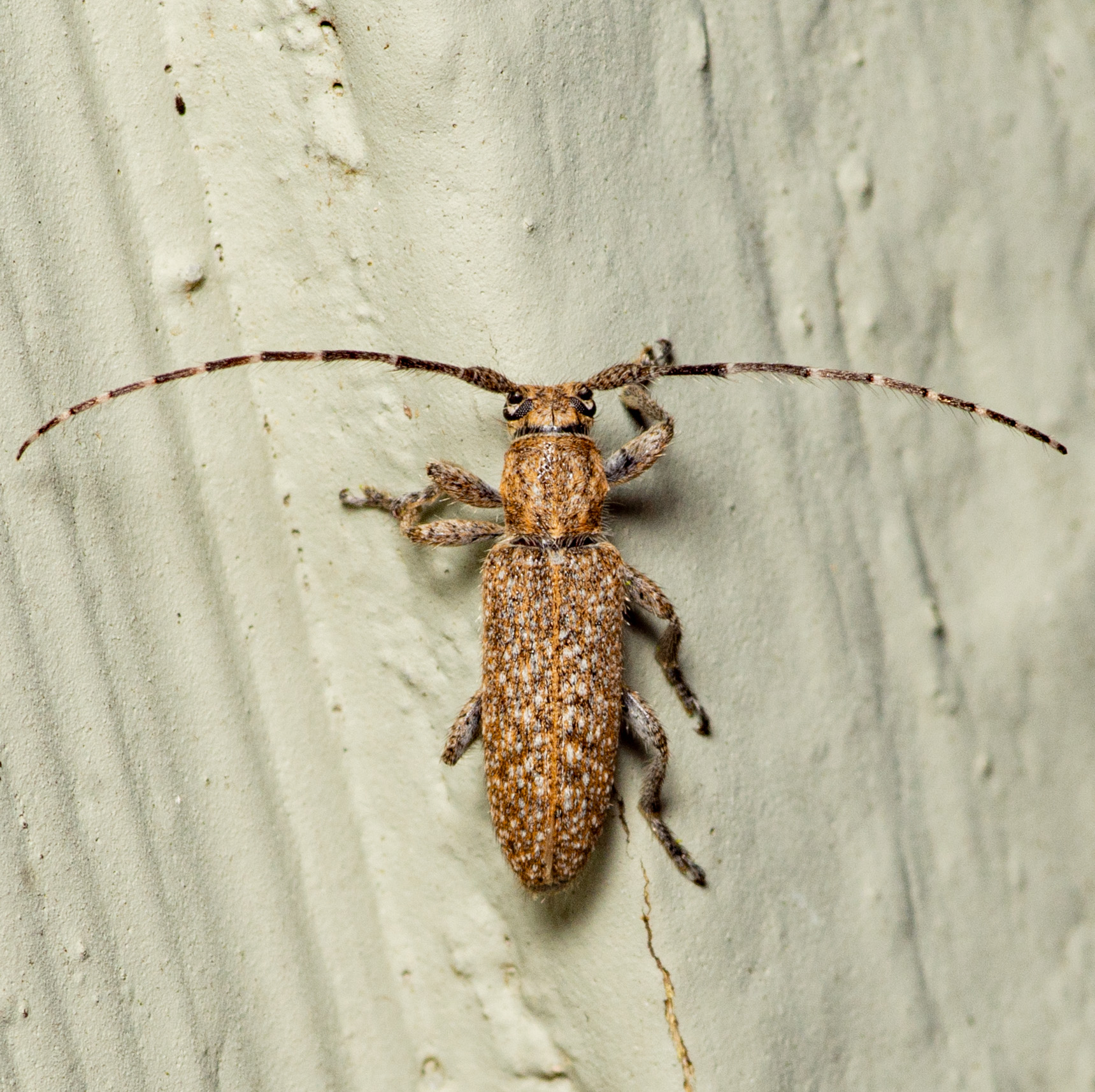

Scientific classification
- Domain: Eukaryota
- Kingdom: Animalia
- Phylum: Arthropoda
- Class: Insecta
- Order: Coleoptera
- Suborder: Polyphaga
- Infraorder: Cucujiformia
- Family: Cerambycidae
- Tribe: Pteropliini
- Genus: Ataxia
- Species: A. hubbardi

Binomial name
- Ataxia hubbardi Fisher, 1924

Synonyms
- Esthlogena hubbardi Breuning, 1961; Esthologena hubbardi Turnbow & Hovore, 1979

= Ataxia hubbardi =

Species of beetle

Ataxia hubbardi is a species of beetle in the family Cerambycidae. It was described by Warren Samuel Fisher in 1924. It is known from the United States and Mexico.
