= Ataxia arizonica =

Scientific classification
- Domain: Eukaryota
- Kingdom: Animalia
- Phylum: Arthropoda
- Class: Insecta
- Order: Coleoptera
- Suborder: Polyphaga
- Infraorder: Cucujiformia
- Family: Cerambycidae
- Tribe: Pteropliini
- Genus: Ataxia
- Species: A. arizonica

Binomial name
- Ataxia arizonica Fisher, 1920

Species of beetle

Ataxia arizonica is a species of beetle in the family Cerambycidae. It was described by Warren Samuel Fisher in 1920. It is known from Mexico and the United States.
