= Dorcadion borisi =

Scientific classification
- Kingdom: Animalia
- Phylum: Arthropoda
- Clade: Pancrustacea
- Class: Insecta
- Order: Coleoptera
- Suborder: Polyphaga
- Infraorder: Cucujiformia
- Family: Cerambycidae
- Genus: Dorcadion
- Species: D. borisi

Binomial name
- Dorcadion borisi Heyrovsky, 1931

Synonyms
- Pedestredorcadion borisi (Heyrovský, 1931)

Species of beetle

Dorcadion borisi is a species of beetle in the family Cerambycidae. It was described by Heyrovsky in 1931. It is known from Macedonia.
