= Dorcadion purkynei =

Scientific classification
- Kingdom: Animalia
- Phylum: Arthropoda
- Clade: Pancrustacea
- Class: Insecta
- Order: Coleoptera
- Suborder: Polyphaga
- Infraorder: Cucujiformia
- Family: Cerambycidae
- Genus: Dorcadion
- Species: D. purkynei

Binomial name
- Dorcadion purkynei Heyrovsky, 1925

Synonyms
- Pedestredorcadion purkynei (Heyrovský, 1925)

Species of beetle

Dorcadion purkynei is a species of beetle in the family Cerambycidae. It was described by Heyrovsky in 1925. It is known from Greece and North Macedonia.
