= Dorcadion balthasari =

Scientific classification
- Kingdom: Animalia
- Phylum: Arthropoda
- Clade: Pancrustacea
- Class: Insecta
- Order: Coleoptera
- Suborder: Polyphaga
- Infraorder: Cucujiformia
- Family: Cerambycidae
- Genus: Dorcadion
- Species: D. balthasari

Binomial name
- Dorcadion balthasari Heyrovsky, 1962

Synonyms
- Carinatodorcadion balthasari (Heyrovsy, 1962)

Species of beetle

Dorcadion balthasari is a species of beetle in the genus Dorcadion in family Cerambycidae. It was described by Leopold Heyrovský in 1962. It is known from Albania.
