= Dorcadion minkovae =

Scientific classification
- Kingdom: Animalia
- Phylum: Arthropoda
- Clade: Pancrustacea
- Class: Insecta
- Order: Coleoptera
- Suborder: Polyphaga
- Infraorder: Cucujiformia
- Family: Cerambycidae
- Genus: Dorcadion
- Species: D. minkovae

Binomial name
- Dorcadion minkovae Heyrovsky, 1962

Synonyms
- Pedestredorcadion minkovae (Heyrovský, 1962)

Species of beetle

Dorcadion minkovae is a species of beetle in the family Cerambycidae. It was described by Heyrovsky in 1962. It is known from Bulgaria.
