= Jean-Louis Mandel =

French medical doctor

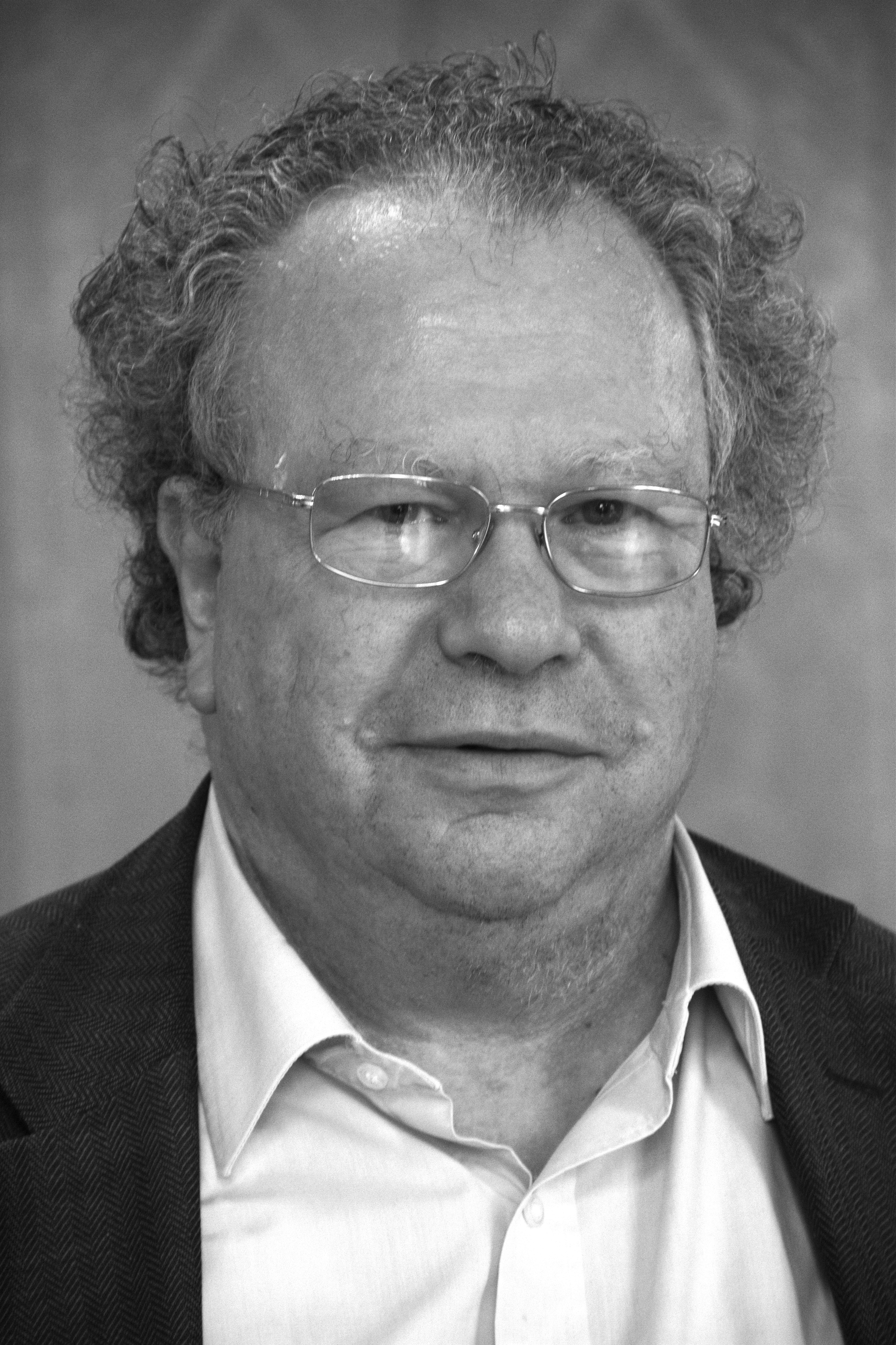
Mandel in May 2013

Jean-Louis Mandel, born in Strasbourg on February 12, 1946, is a French medical doctor and geneticist, and heads a research team at the Institute of Genetics and Molecular and Cellular Biology (IGBMC). He has been in charge of the genetic diagnosis laboratory at the University Hospitals of Strasbourg since 1992, as well as a professor at the Collège de France (Chair of Human Genetics) since 2003.

== Biography ==
Doctor of Medicine (1971) and Doctor of Science (1974) from the University of Strasbourg (theses prepared under the supervision of Prof. Pierre Chambon), Jean-Louis Mandel was Associate Professor of Biochemistry at the Faculty of Medicine of the University of Strasbourg from 1978 to 1984, then Professor of Medical Genetics at the same Faculty from 1984 to 2003 before being appointed to the Chair of Human Genetics at the Collège de France. He leads a research team in human genetics at the LGME (Laboratoire de Génétique Moléculaire des Eucaryotes, directed by Pierre Chambon) which became the Institute of Genetics and Molecular and Cellular Biology (IGBMC) in 1994. He started a molecular diagnosis of genetic diseases in 1985, which became the genetic diagnosis laboratory at the University Hospitals of Strasbourg in 1992, for which he has been responsible since then. Jean-Louis Mandel was appointed Director of the Institute of Genetics and Molecular and Cellular Biology (IGBMC) from 2002 to 2007, following its founder Pierre Chambon, then Deputy Director from 2007 to 2009. From 2008 to 2009, he was Director of the Mouse Clinic (ICS). He has also been a full member of the French Academy of sciences since 1999 and a corresponding member of the French Academy of Medicine.

== Scientific contribution ==
Since 1982, Jean-Louis Mandel has been working on the identification of genes and mutations responsible for rare inherited monogenic diseases affecting the nervous system and/or muscles. He has also contributed to the development of diagnostic tests and the analysis of pathophysiological mechanisms for several of these diseases, using animal or cellular models in particular. His most important contribution concerns the identification and characterization of the mutation mechanism by unstable expansion of trinucleotide repetition. In 1991, his team showed that Fragile X intellectual disability syndrome, the most common cause of hereditary intellectual disability, is due to the expansion of a CGG repetition associated with localized abnormal DNA methylation (Oberlé et al. Sciences, 1991). From 1995 to 1997 his team (with notably Yvon Trottier), in collaboration with Alexis Brice's team (Hôpital Pitié Salpétrière) identified polyglutamine expansions as pathogenic epitopes in Huntington's disease and four other dominant ataxias, which led to the identification of genes involved in the spinocerebellar ataxias SCA2 and SCA7 (Trottier et al, Nature, 1995, Imbert et al. Nat Genet 1996, David et al. Nat Genet 1997). In 1996, with Michel Koenig and Massimo Pandolfo, he showed that Friedreich's Ataxia, a neurodegenerative disease, is caused by the expansion of a GAA repetition in the gene encoding a protein of unknown function, frataxin, and participates in clinical and genetic studies on this disease (Dürr et al, NEJM, 1996). Jean-Louis Mandel has also identified the genes responsible for adrenoleukodystrophy, with Patrick Aubourg (Mosser et al, Nature, 1993), ataxia with isolated vitamin E deficiency with Michel Koenig (Ouahchi et al, Nature Genetics, 1995), Coffin-Lowry syndrome (intellectual disability linked to chromosome X) with André Hanauer (Trivier et al, Nature, 1996). His work with Jocelyn Laporte has led to the identification of the mutated MTM1 gene in X-linked myotubular myopathy (Laporte et al Nat Genet 1996) and more recently the mutated BIN1 gene in autosomal recessive centronuclear myopathy (Nicot et al, Nature Genet, 2007). For several years, Jean-Louis Mandel has concentrated a significant part of his activity on the development of effective strategies for the molecular diagnosis of monogenic intellectual deficiencies, which affect more than 1% of the population and are characterized by extreme genetic heterogeneity, and for a better clinical knowledge of these different genetic forms (projet GenIDA [2] [archive]) (Piton et al, AJHG, 2013, and Redin et al. J Med Genet 2014).

== Awards and honours ==
- 2022: Kavli Prize in Neuroscience.
- 2009: Prize of the French Academy of Medicine - France
- 2008: Chevalier in the Ordre National de la Légion d'Honneur - France
- 2006: Grand-prix of the Foundation for Medical Research - France
- 2004: Neuronal Plasticity Prize, awarded by the Ipsen Foundation - France
- 2001: K.J. Zülch Award for Neurology Research, awarded by the Reesmtsma Foundation and the Max Planck Society - Germany
- 1999: Louis-Jeantet Prize for Medicine, elected member of the Academy of Sciences - Switzerland
- 1998: ESHG Award, awarded for the European Society of Human Genetics - Europe
- 1994: Richard-Lounsbery Prize from the French Academy of sciences and the National Academy of Sciences - USA & France
- 1993: Elected correspondent of the French Academy of sciences - France
- 1992: International San Remo Award for Genetic Research, awarded by the Italian Society of Human Genetics - Italy
- 1988: Research prize of the Allianz-Institut de France Foundation. - France

== Representative publications ==
J.L. Mandel has published more than 350 articles and has an H-index of 86 (Web of Science, January 2015). Below, about thirty representative publications (* publications cited more than 200 times, ** more than 500 times)

- Redin, C., […], Mandel, J.-L., Piton, A. Efficient strategy for the molecular diagnosis of intellectual disability using targeted high-throughput sequencing. J. Med. Genet. (2014).
- Piton, A., […], Mandel, J.-L. 20 ans après: a second mutation in MAOA identified by targeted high-throughput sequencing in a family with altered behavior and cognition. Eur. J. Hum. Genet. (2013).
- Piton, A., Redin, C. & Mandel, J.-L. XLID-causing mutations and associated genes challenged in light of data from large-scale human exome sequencing. Am. J. Hum. Genet. 93, 368–83 (2013).
- Redin, C., […], Mandel, J.-L., Muller, J. Targeted high-throughput sequencing for diagnosis of genetically heterogeneous diseases: efficient mutation detection in Bardet-Biedl and Alström syndromes. J. Med. Genet. 49, 502–12 (2012).
- Cossée, M., […], Mandel, J.-L. et al. ARX polyalanine expansions are highly implicated in familial cases of mental retardation with infantile epilepsy and/or hand dystonia. Am. J. Med. Genet. Part A 155, 98–105 (2011).
- Subramanian, M., […], Mandel, J.-L., Moine, H. G-quadruplex RNA structure as a signal for neurite mRNA targeting. EMBO Rep. 12, 697–704 (2011).
- Buj-Bello, A., […], Mandel, J.-L. AAV-mediated intramuscular delivery of myotubularin corrects the myotubular myopathy phenotype in targeted murine muscle and suggests a function in plasma membrane homeostasis. Hum. Mol. Genet. 17, 2132–43 (2008).
- Nicot, A.-S., […], Mandel, J.-L., Laporte, J. Mutations in amphiphysin 2 (BIN1) disrupt interaction with dynamin 2 and cause autosomal recessive centronuclear myopathy. Nat. Genet. 39, 1134–9 (2007).
- Stoetzel, C., […], Mandel, J.-L., Dollfus, H. Identification of a novel BBS gene (BBS12) highlights the major role of a vertebrate-specific branch of chaperonin-related proteins in Bardet-Biedl syndrome. Am. J. Hum. Genet. 80, 1–11 (2007).
- Stoetzel, C., […], Mandel, J.-L., Katsanis, N., Dollfus, H. BBS10 encodes a vertebrate-specific chaperonin-like protein and is a major BBS locus. Nat. Genet. 38, 521–4 (2006).
- Pujol, A., […], Mandel, J.-L. Functional overlap between ABCD1 (ALD) and ABCD2 (ALDR) transporters: a therapeutic target for X-adrenoleukodystrophy. Hum. Mol. Genet. 13, 2997–3006 (2004).
- Mandel, J.-L. & Chelly, J. Monogenic X-linked mental retardation: is it as frequent as currently estimated? The paradox of the ARX (Aristaless X) mutations. Eur. J. Hum. Genet. 12, 689–93 (2004).
- Biancalana, V, […], Mandel, J.-L. Five years of molecular diagnosis of Fragile X syndrome (1997-2001): A collaborative study reporting 95% of the activity in France. American Journal Of Medical Genetics 129A, 218-224 (2004).
- Schenck, A, […], Mandel, J.-L. and Giangrande A. CYFIP/Sra-1 controls neuronal connectivity in Drosophila and links the Rac1 GTPase pathway to the fragile X protein Neuron 38, 887-898, (2003).
- Buj-Bello, A, […], Mandel, J.-L. The lipid phosphatase myotubularin is essential for skeletal muscle maintenance but not for myogenesis in mice. Proceedings Of The National Academy Of Sciences Of The USA 99, 15060-15065 (2002).
- Lunkes, A, […], Mandel, J.-L. and Trottier Y. Proteases acting on mutant Huntingtin generate cleaved products that differentially build up cytoplasmic and nuclear inclusions Molecular Cell, 10, 259-269 (2002).
- Bardoni, B and Mandel, J.-L. Advances in understanding of fragile X pathogenesis and FMRP function, and in identification of X linked mental retardation genes. Current Opinion In Genetics & Development 12, 284-293 (2002).
- Pujol, A, […], Mandel, J.-L. Late onset neurological phenotype of the X-ALD gene inactivation in mice: a mouse model for adrenomyeloneuropathy Human Molecular Genetics, 11, 499-505 (2002).
- Schaeffer, C, Bardoni, B, Mandel, J.-L., et al. The fragile X mental retardation protein binds specifically to its mRNA via a purine quartet motif Embo Journal, 20, 4803-4813 (2001) *
- Chelly, J and Mandel, J.-L. Monogenic causes of X-linked mental retardation Nature Reviews Genetics, 2, 669-680 (2001).
- Blondeau, F, […], Mandel, J.-L. Myotubularin, a phosphatase deficient in myotubular myopathy, acts on phosphatidylinositol 3-kinase and phosphatidylinositol 3-phosphate pathway Human Molecular Genetics, 9, 2223-2229 (2000).
- Merienne, K, […], Mandel, J.-L. et al. A missense mutation in RPS6KA3 (RSK2) responsible for non-specific mental retardation. Nature Genetics, 22, 13-14 (1999).
- Jacquot, S, […], Mandel, J.-L. et al. Mutation analysis of the RSK2 gene in Coffin-Lowry patients: Extensive allelic heterogeneity and a high rate of de novo mutations. American Journal Of Human Genetics, 63, 1631-1640 (1998)
- David, G, […], Mandel, J.-L. and Brice, A. Cloning of the SCA7 gene reveals a highly unstable CAG repeat expansion. Nature Genetics, 17, 65-70 (1997). *
- Trivier, E, […], Mandel, J.-L. et al. Mutations in the kinase Rsk-2 associated with Coffin-Lowry syndrome. Nature, 384, 567-570 (1996). *
- Imbert, G, […], Mandel, J.-L. et al. Cloning of the gene for spinocerebellar ataxia 2 reveals a locus with high sensitivity to expanded CAG/glutamine repeats. Nature Genetics 14, 285-291 (1996). **
- Durr, A, […], Mandel, J.-L. et al. Clinical and genetic abnormalities in patients with Friedreich's ataxia. New England Journal Of Medicine, 335, 1169-1175 (1996). *
- Laporte, J. […], Mandel, J.-L. et al. A gene mutated in X-linked myotubular myopathy defines a new putative tyrosine phosphatase family conserved in yeast. Nat. Genet. 13, 175–82 (1996). *
- Trottier, Y, […] Mandel, J.-L. Polyglutamine Expansion As A Pathological Epitope In Huntingtons-Disease And 4 Dominant Cerebellar Ataxias. Nature, 378, 403-406 (1995). *
- Ouahchi, K, […], Mandel, J.-L. and Koenig, M. Ataxia with isolated vitamin-e-deficiency is caused by mutations in the alpha-tocopherol transfer protein. Nature Genetics, 9, 141-145 (1995)
- Rousseau, F, […], Mandel, J.-L. A multicenter study on genotype-phenotype correlations in the fragile-x-syndrome, using direct diagnosis with probe stb-12.3 - the first 2,253 cases. American Journal Of Human Genetics, 55, 225-237 (1994). *
- Devys, D, […], Mandel, J.-L. The fmr-1 protein is cytoplasmic, most abundant in neurons and appears normal in carriers of a fragile x permutation. Nature Genetics, 4, 335-340 (1993). *
- Mosser, J, […], Mandel, J.-L. and Aubourg. Putative x-linked adrenoleukodystrophy gene shares unexpected homology with abc transporters. Nature, 361, 726-730 (1993). **
- Devys, D, […], Mandel, J.-L. and Oberlé, I. Analysis of full fragile-x mutations in fetal tissues and monozygotic twins indicate that abnormal methylation and somatic heterogeneity are established early in development. American Journal Of Medical Genetics, 43, 208-216 (1992).
- Rousseau, F, […], Mandel, J.-L. Direct diagnosis by dna analysis of the fragile x-syndrome of mental-retardation. New England Journal of Medicine, 325, 1673-1681 (1991). **
- Oberle, I, […], Mandel, J.-L. Instability of a 550 base pair dna segment and abnormal methylation in fragile x-syndrome. Science, 252, 1097-1102 (1991). **
