= Pterolophia gregalis =

Scientific classification
- Kingdom: Animalia
- Phylum: Arthropoda
- Clade: Pancrustacea
- Class: Insecta
- Order: Coleoptera
- Suborder: Polyphaga
- Infraorder: Cucujiformia
- Family: Cerambycidae
- Genus: Pterolophia
- Species: P. gregalis

Binomial name
- Pterolophia gregalis Fisher, 1927

Species of beetle

Pterolophia gregalis is a species of beetle in the family Cerambycidae. It was described by Warren Samuel Fisher in 1927.
