= Dorcadion tuleskovi =

Scientific classification
- Kingdom: Animalia
- Phylum: Arthropoda
- Clade: Pancrustacea
- Class: Insecta
- Order: Coleoptera
- Suborder: Polyphaga
- Infraorder: Cucujiformia
- Family: Cerambycidae
- Genus: Dorcadion
- Species: D. tuleskovi

Binomial name
- Dorcadion tuleskovi Heyrovsky, 1937

Synonyms
- Dorcadion frigidum Meschnigg, 1947; Dorcadion olympicola Heyrovsky, 1941; Pedestredorcadion olympicola (Heyrovský) Sama, 2002; Pedestredorcadion tuleskovi (Heyrovský) Sama, 2002

Species of beetle

Dorcadion tuleskovi is a species of beetle in the family Cerambycidae. It was described by Heyrovsky in 1937. It is known from Greece.
