= Dorcadion taborskyi =

Scientific classification
- Kingdom: Animalia
- Phylum: Arthropoda
- Clade: Pancrustacea
- Class: Insecta
- Order: Coleoptera
- Suborder: Polyphaga
- Infraorder: Cucujiformia
- Family: Cerambycidae
- Genus: Dorcadion
- Species: D. taborskyi

Binomial name
- Dorcadion taborskyi Heyrovsky, 1941

Synonyms
- Dorcadion joanninae Breuning, 1967; Dorcadion lianokladii Breuning, 1962; Dorcadion margheritae Breuning, 1964; Dorcadion wewalkai Breuning, 1974; Pedestredorcadion joanninae (Breuning) Sama, 2002; Pedestredorcadion lianokladii (Breuning) Sama, 2002; Pedestredorcadion margheritae (Breuning) Sama, 2002; Pedestredorcadion taborskyi (Heyrovský) Sama, 2002; Pedestredorcadion wewalkai (Breuning) Sama, 2002

Species of beetle

Dorcadion taborskyi is a species of beetle in the family Cerambycidae. It was described by Heyrovsky in 1941. It is known from Greece and Turkey.
