= Dystasia variegata =

Scientific classification
- Domain: Eukaryota
- Kingdom: Animalia
- Phylum: Arthropoda
- Class: Insecta
- Order: Coleoptera
- Suborder: Polyphaga
- Infraorder: Cucujiformia
- Family: Cerambycidae
- Tribe: Pteropliini
- Genus: Dystasia
- Species: D. variegata

Binomial name
- Dystasia variegata Fisher, 1936

Species of beetle

Dystasia variegata is a species of beetle in the family Cerambycidae. It was described by Warren Samuel Fisher in 1936.
