= Ataxia operaria =

Scientific classification
- Kingdom: Animalia
- Phylum: Arthropoda
- Class: Insecta
- Order: Coleoptera
- Suborder: Polyphaga
- Infraorder: Cucujiformia
- Family: Cerambycidae
- Genus: Ataxia
- Species: A. operaria

Binomial name
- Ataxia operaria (Erichson in Schomburg, 1848)

Synonyms
- Esthlogena operaria (Erichson, 1848); Hebestola operaria Erichson in Schomburg, 1848; Parysatis flavescens Bates, 1880; Parysatis nigritarsis Thomson, 1868; Ataxia lineata (Fabricius, 1792)

Species of beetle

Ataxia operaria is a species of beetle in the family Cerambycidae. It was described by Wilhelm Ferdinand Erichson in 1848, originally under the genus Hebestola. It has a wide distribution in South and Central America.
