= Pterolophia aeneipennis =

Scientific classification
- Kingdom: Animalia
- Phylum: Arthropoda
- Class: Insecta
- Order: Coleoptera
- Suborder: Polyphaga
- Infraorder: Cucujiformia
- Family: Cerambycidae
- Genus: Pterolophia
- Species: P. aeneipennis

Binomial name
- Pterolophia aeneipennis Breuning & Heyrovsky, 1964

Species of beetle

Pterolophia aeneipennis is a species of beetle in the family Cerambycidae. It was described by Stephan von Breuning and Heyrovsky in 1964.
