= Ataxia variegata =

Scientific classification
- Kingdom: Animalia
- Phylum: Arthropoda
- Clade: Pancrustacea
- Class: Insecta
- Order: Coleoptera
- Suborder: Polyphaga
- Infraorder: Cucujiformia
- Family: Cerambycidae
- Genus: Ataxia
- Species: A. variegata

Binomial name
- Ataxia variegata Fisher, 1925

Species of beetle

Ataxia variegata is a species of beetle in the family Cerambycidae. It was described by Warren Samuel Fisher in 1925. It is known from Cuba.
