= Ataxia mucronata =

Scientific classification
- Domain: Eukaryota
- Kingdom: Animalia
- Phylum: Arthropoda
- Class: Insecta
- Order: Coleoptera
- Suborder: Polyphaga
- Infraorder: Cucujiformia
- Family: Cerambycidae
- Tribe: Pteropliini
- Genus: Ataxia
- Species: A. mucronata

Binomial name
- Ataxia mucronata (Bates, 1866)

Synonyms
- Esthlogena mucronata Bates, 1866; Parysatis mucronata Aurivillius, 1922

Species of beetle

Ataxia mucronata is a species of beetle in the family Cerambycidae. It was described by Henry Walter Bates in 1866. It is known from French Guiana and Brazil.
