= Egesina anfracta =

Scientific classification
- Domain: Eukaryota
- Kingdom: Animalia
- Phylum: Arthropoda
- Class: Insecta
- Order: Coleoptera
- Suborder: Polyphaga
- Infraorder: Cucujiformia
- Family: Cerambycidae
- Tribe: Pteropliini
- Genus: Egesina
- Species: E. anfracta

Binomial name
- Egesina anfracta (Gressitt, 1940)

Species of beetle

Egesina anfracta is a species of beetle in the family Cerambycidae of long-horned beetles. It was described by Gressitt in 1940.
