= Dystasia grisescens =

Scientific classification
- Kingdom: Animalia
- Phylum: Arthropoda
- Class: Insecta
- Order: Coleoptera
- Suborder: Polyphaga
- Infraorder: Cucujiformia
- Family: Cerambycidae
- Genus: Dystasia
- Species: D. grisescens

Binomial name
- Dystasia grisescens Breuning, 1954

Species of beetle

Dystasia grisescens is a species of beetle in the family Cerambycidae. It was described by Stephan von Breuning in 1954.
