= Dystasia bella =

Scientific classification
- Kingdom: Animalia
- Phylum: Arthropoda
- Class: Insecta
- Order: Coleoptera
- Suborder: Polyphaga
- Infraorder: Cucujiformia
- Family: Cerambycidae
- Genus: Dystasia
- Species: D. bella

Binomial name
- Dystasia bella (Breuning, 1940)

Species of beetle

Dystasia bella is a species of beetle in the family Cerambycidae. It was described by Stephan von Breuning in 1940.
