= Ataxia falli =

Scientific classification
- Kingdom: Animalia
- Phylum: Arthropoda
- Class: Insecta
- Order: Coleoptera
- Suborder: Polyphaga
- Infraorder: Cucujiformia
- Family: Cerambycidae
- Genus: Ataxia
- Species: A. falli

Binomial name
- Ataxia falli Breuning, 1961

Synonyms
- Ataxia sulcata Fall, 1907

Species of beetle

Ataxia falli is a species of beetle in the family Cerambycidae. It was described by Stephan von Breuning in 1961. It is known from the United States.
