= Ataxia prolixa =

Scientific classification
- Kingdom: Animalia
- Phylum: Arthropoda
- Class: Insecta
- Order: Coleoptera
- Suborder: Polyphaga
- Infraorder: Cucujiformia
- Family: Cerambycidae
- Genus: Ataxia
- Species: A. prolixa

Binomial name
- Ataxia prolixa (Bates, 1866)

Synonyms
- Esthlogena prolixa Bates, 1866

Species of beetle

Ataxia prolixa is a species of beetle in the family Cerambycidae. It was described by Henry Walter Bates in 1866. It is known from French Guiana and Brazil.
