= Ataxia spinipennis =

Scientific classification
- Domain: Eukaryota
- Kingdom: Animalia
- Phylum: Arthropoda
- Class: Insecta
- Order: Coleoptera
- Suborder: Polyphaga
- Infraorder: Cucujiformia
- Family: Cerambycidae
- Tribe: Pteropliini
- Genus: Ataxia
- Species: A. spinipennis

Binomial name
- Ataxia spinipennis Chevrolat, 1862

Synonyms
- Proecha spinipennis Thomson, 1864

Species of beetle

Ataxia spinipennis is a species of beetle in the family Cerambycidae. It was described by Louis Alexandre Auguste Chevrolat in 1862. It is known from Puerto Rico and Cuba.
