= Pseudestoloides hiekei =

Scientific classification
- Kingdom: Animalia
- Phylum: Arthropoda
- Class: Insecta
- Order: Coleoptera
- Suborder: Polyphaga
- Infraorder: Cucujiformia
- Family: Cerambycidae
- Genus: Pseudestoloides
- Species: P. hiekei

Binomial name
- Pseudestoloides hiekei Breuning, 1974

Species of beetle

Pseudestoloides hiekei is a species of beetle in the family Cerambycidae. It was described by Stephan von Breuning in 1974. It is known from Mexico.
