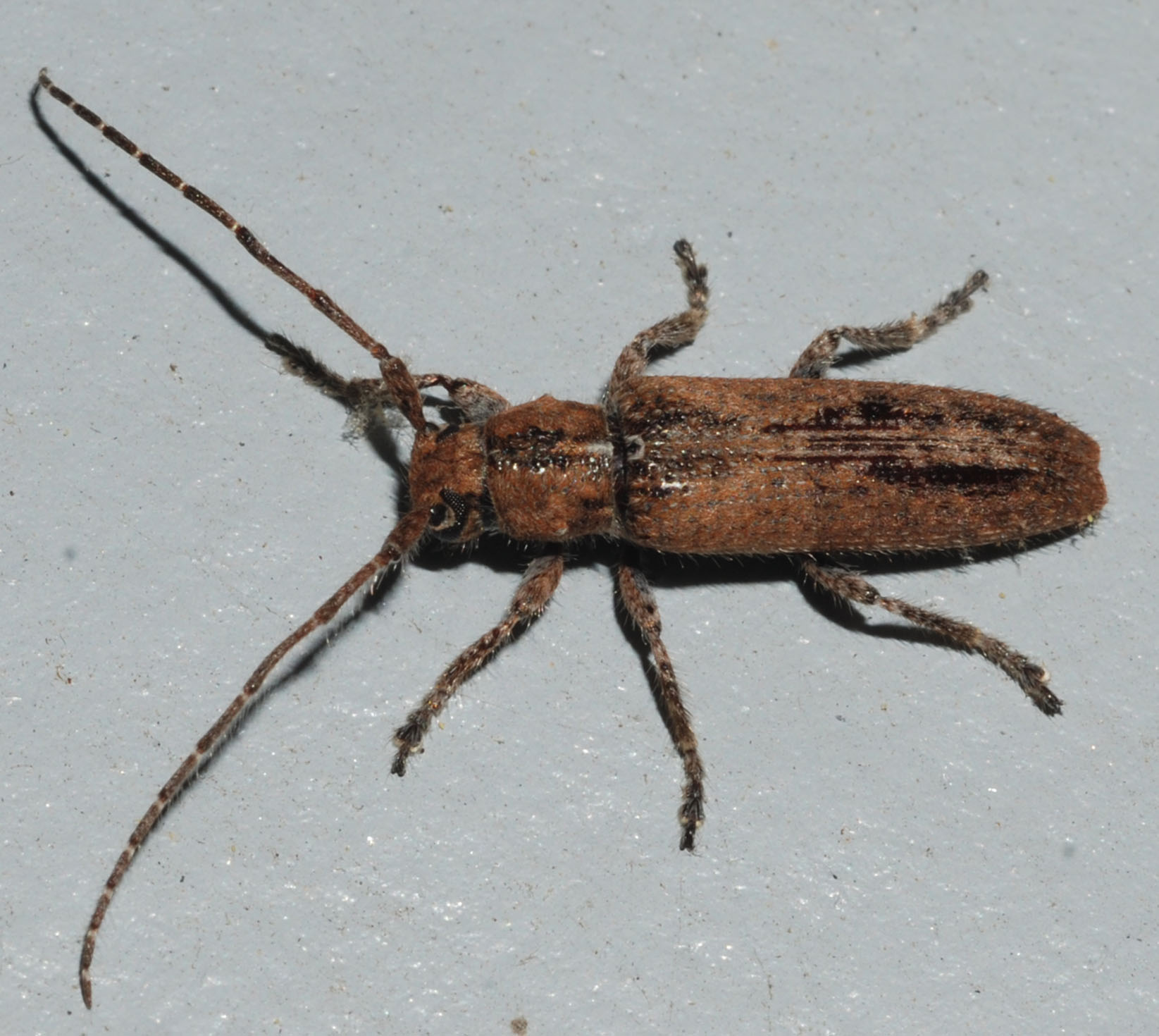

Scientific classification
- Domain: Eukaryota
- Kingdom: Animalia
- Phylum: Arthropoda
- Class: Insecta
- Order: Coleoptera
- Suborder: Polyphaga
- Infraorder: Cucujiformia
- Family: Cerambycidae
- Tribe: Pteropliini
- Genus: Ataxia
- Species: A. crypta

Binomial name
- Ataxia crypta (Say, 1831)

Synonyms
- Amniscus? cryptus (Say, 1832); Ataxia sordida Haldeman, 1847; Lamia crypta Say, 1832; Leptostylus cryptus (Say, 1832); Saperda annulata Fabricius, 1801 nec 1792; Stenosoma sordidum (Haldeman, 1847); Stenosoma crypta (Say, 1832) (misspelling); Stenosoma sordida (Haldeman, 1847) (misspelling); Ataxia lineata (Fabricius, 1792)

= Ataxia crypta =

Species of beetle

Ataxia crypta is a species of beetle in the family Cerambycidae. It was described by Thomas Say in 1831, originally under the genus Lamia. It is known from the United States and Mexico.
