= Egesina picina =

Scientific classification
- Domain: Eukaryota
- Kingdom: Animalia
- Phylum: Arthropoda
- Class: Insecta
- Order: Coleoptera
- Suborder: Polyphaga
- Infraorder: Cucujiformia
- Family: Cerambycidae
- Tribe: Pteropliini
- Genus: Egesina
- Species: E. picina

Binomial name
- Egesina picina Holzschuh, 2007

Species of beetle

Egesina picina is a species of beetle in the family Cerambycidae. It was described by Holzschuh in 2007.
