= Egesina mjobergi =

Scientific classification
- Kingdom: Animalia
- Phylum: Arthropoda
- Class: Insecta
- Order: Coleoptera
- Suborder: Polyphaga
- Infraorder: Cucujiformia
- Family: Cerambycidae
- Genus: Egesina
- Species: E. mjobergi

Binomial name
- Egesina mjobergi Breuning, 1950

Species of beetle

Egesina mjobergi is a species of beetle in the family Cerambycidae. It was described by Stephan von Breuning in 1950. It is known from Borneo.
