= Egesina flavoapicalis =

Scientific classification
- Kingdom: Animalia
- Phylum: Arthropoda
- Class: Insecta
- Order: Coleoptera
- Suborder: Polyphaga
- Infraorder: Cucujiformia
- Family: Cerambycidae
- Genus: Egesina
- Species: E. flavoapicalis

Binomial name
- Egesina flavoapicalis Hayashi, 1971

Species of beetle

Egesina flavoapicalis is a species of beetle in the family Cerambycidae. It was described by Masao Hayashi in 1971.
