= Ataxia cayennensis =

Scientific classification
- Kingdom: Animalia
- Phylum: Arthropoda
- Class: Insecta
- Order: Coleoptera
- Suborder: Polyphaga
- Infraorder: Cucujiformia
- Family: Cerambycidae
- Genus: Ataxia
- Species: A. cayennensis

Binomial name
- Ataxia cayennensis Breuning, 1940

Species of beetle

Ataxia cayennensis is a species of beetle in the family Cerambycidae. It was described by Stephan von Breuning in 1940. It is known from French Guiana.
