= Egesina formosana =

Scientific classification
- Domain: Eukaryota
- Kingdom: Animalia
- Phylum: Arthropoda
- Class: Insecta
- Order: Coleoptera
- Suborder: Polyphaga
- Infraorder: Cucujiformia
- Family: Cerambycidae
- Tribe: Pteropliini
- Genus: Egesina
- Species: E. formosana

Binomial name
- Egesina formosana (Schwarzer, 1925)

Species of beetle

Egesina formosana is a species of beetle in the family Cerambycidae. It was described by Bernhard Schwarzer in 1925.
