= Egesina guerryi =

Scientific classification
- Kingdom: Animalia
- Phylum: Arthropoda
- Class: Insecta
- Order: Coleoptera
- Suborder: Polyphaga
- Infraorder: Cucujiformia
- Family: Cerambycidae
- Genus: Egesina
- Species: E. guerryi

Binomial name
- Egesina guerryi (Pic, 1926)

Species of beetle

Egesina guerryi is a species of beetle in the family Cerambycidae. It was described by Maurice Pic in 1926.
