= Egesina picta =

Scientific classification
- Kingdom: Animalia
- Phylum: Arthropoda
- Class: Insecta
- Order: Coleoptera
- Suborder: Polyphaga
- Infraorder: Cucujiformia
- Family: Cerambycidae
- Genus: Egesina
- Species: E. picta

Binomial name
- Egesina picta Breuning, 1940

Species of beetle

Egesina picta is a species of beetle in the family Cerambycidae. It was described by Stephan von Breuning in 1940. It is known from Borneo.
