= Dystasia siporensis =

Scientific classification
- Kingdom: Animalia
- Phylum: Arthropoda
- Class: Insecta
- Order: Coleoptera
- Suborder: Polyphaga
- Infraorder: Cucujiformia
- Family: Cerambycidae
- Genus: Dystasia
- Species: D. siporensis

Binomial name
- Dystasia siporensis Breuning, 1939

Species of beetle

Dystasia siporensis is a species of beetle in the family Cerambycidae native to Sumatra. It was described by Stephan von Breuning in 1939.
