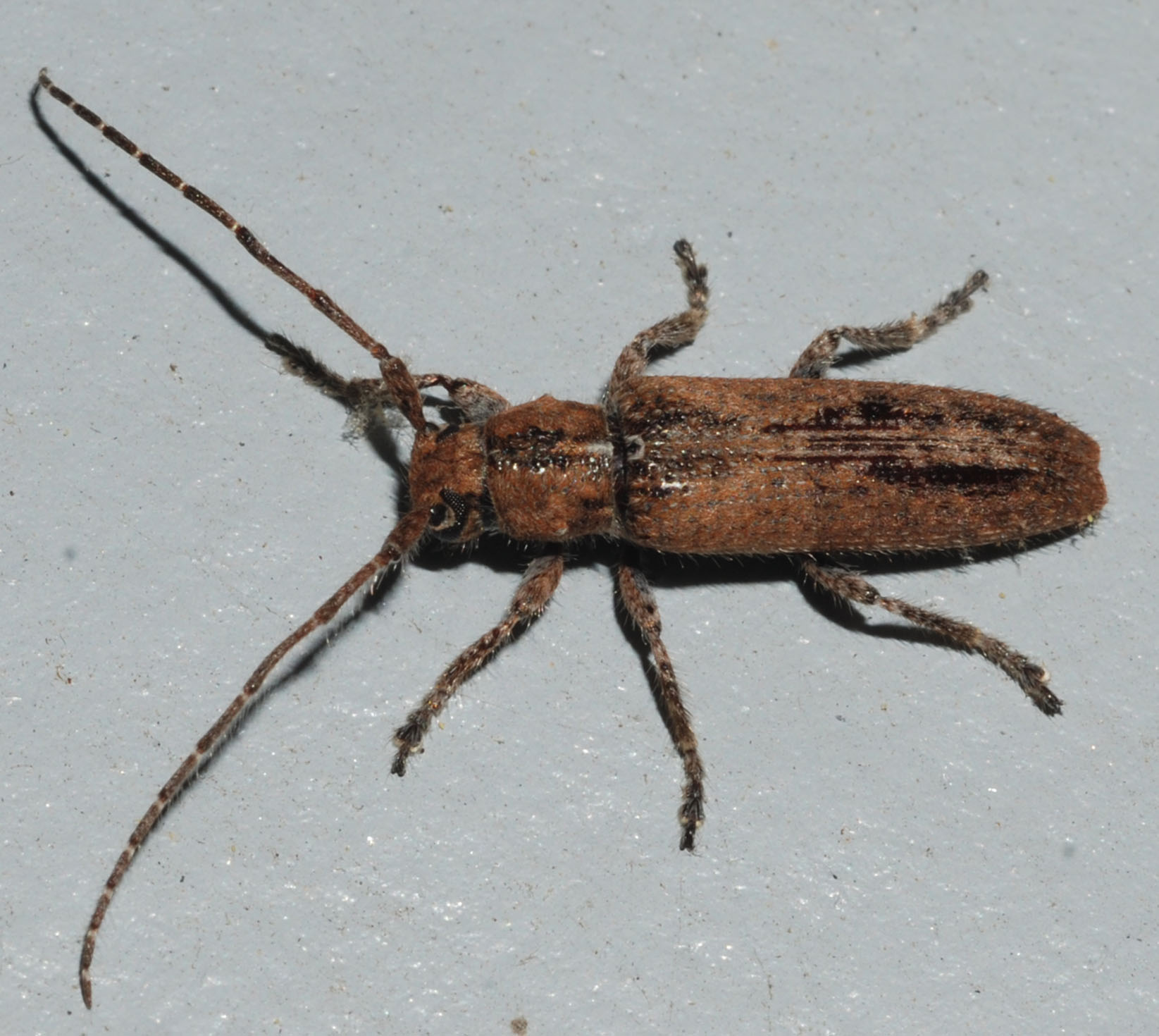
- Ataxia crypta

Scientific classification
- Domain: Eukaryota
- Kingdom: Animalia
- Phylum: Arthropoda
- Class: Insecta
- Order: Coleoptera
- Suborder: Polyphaga
- Infraorder: Cucujiformia
- Family: Cerambycidae
- Tribe: Pteropliini
- Genus: Ataxia; Haldeman, 1847

Synonyms
- Stenidea Haldeman, 1847; Stenosoma LeConte, 1852; Proecha Thomson in Chevrolat, 1862; Esthlogena Bates, 1866; Parysatis Thomson, 1868; Parepectasis Bruch, 1926

= Ataxia (beetle) =

Genus of beetles

Ataxia, described by Haldeman in 1847, is an American genus of longhorn beetles of the subfamily Lamiinae, tribe Pteropliini.

== Distribution ==
Ataxia is primarily widespread in South America, but several endemic species are present in Central America and in the Antilles. Only few species reach the South-western United States.

Ataxia contains the following species:

- Ataxia acutipennis (Thomson, 1868)
- Ataxia albisetosa Breuning, 1940
- Ataxia alboscutellata Fisher, 1926
- Ataxia alpha Chemsak & Noguera, 1993
- Ataxia arenaria Martins & Galileo, 2013
- Ataxia arizonica Fisher, 1920
- Ataxia brunnea Champlain & Knull, 1926
- Ataxia camiriensis Galileo & Santos-Silva, 2016
- Ataxia canescens (Bates, 1880)
- Ataxia cayennensis Breuning, 1940
- Ataxia cayensis Chemsak & Feller, 1988
- Ataxia cineracea Galileo & Martins, 2007
- Ataxia crassa Vitali, 2007
- Ataxia crypta (Say, 1831)
- Ataxia cylindrica Breuning, 1940
- Ataxia estoloides Breuning, 1940
- Ataxia falli Breuning, 1961
- Ataxia fulvifrons (Bates, 1885)
- Ataxia haitiensis Fisher, 1932
- Ataxia heppneri Wappes, Santos-Silva & Galileo, 2017
- Ataxia hovorei Lingafelter & Nearns, 2007
- Ataxia hubbardi Fisher, 1924
- Ataxia illita (Bates, 1885)
- Ataxia luteifrons (Bruch, 1926)
- Ataxia mucronata (Bates, 1866)
- Ataxia nivisparsa (Bates, 1885)
- Ataxia obscura (Fabricius, 1801)
- Ataxia obtusa (Bates, 1866)
- Ataxia operaria Erichson in Schomburg, 1848
- Ataxia parva Galileo & Martins, 2011
- Ataxia perplexa (Gahan, 1892)
- Ataxia piauiensis Martins & Galileo, 2012
- Ataxia prolixa (Bates, 1866)
- Ataxia rufitarsis (Bates, 1880)
- Ataxia setulosa Fall, 1907
- Ataxia spinicauda Schaeffer, 1904
- Ataxia spinipennis Chevrolat, 1862
- Ataxia stehliki Chemsak, 1966
- Ataxia tibialis Schaeffer, 1908
- Ataxia uniformis Fisher, 1926
- Ataxia variegata Fisher, 1925
- Ataxia yucatana Breuning, 1940
