= Ataxia hovorei =

Scientific classification
- Domain: Eukaryota
- Kingdom: Animalia
- Phylum: Arthropoda
- Class: Insecta
- Order: Coleoptera
- Suborder: Polyphaga
- Infraorder: Cucujiformia
- Family: Cerambycidae
- Tribe: Pteropliini
- Genus: Ataxia
- Species: A. hovorei

Binomial name
- Ataxia hovorei Lingafelter & Nearns, 2007

Species of beetle

Ataxia hovorei is a species of beetle in the family Cerambycidae. It was described by Lingafelter and Nearns in 2007. It is known from the Dominican Republic.
