= Dystasia affinis =

Scientific classification
- Domain: Eukaryota
- Kingdom: Animalia
- Phylum: Arthropoda
- Class: Insecta
- Order: Coleoptera
- Suborder: Polyphaga
- Infraorder: Cucujiformia
- Family: Cerambycidae
- Tribe: Pteropliini
- Genus: Dystasia
- Species: D. affinis

Binomial name
- Dystasia affinis Gahan, 1906

Species of beetle

Dystasia affinis is a species of beetle in the family Cerambycidae. It was described by Charles Joseph Gahan in 1906.
