= Dystasia nubila =

Scientific classification
- Kingdom: Animalia
- Phylum: Arthropoda
- Clade: Pancrustacea
- Class: Insecta
- Order: Coleoptera
- Suborder: Polyphaga
- Infraorder: Cucujiformia
- Family: Cerambycidae
- Genus: Dystasia
- Species: D. nubila

Binomial name
- Dystasia nubila Pascoe, 1886

Species of beetle

Dystasia nubila is a species of beetle in the family Cerambycidae. It was described by Francis Polkinghorne Pascoe in 1886. It is known from Sumatra and Borneo.
