= Pseudestoloides =

Scientific classification
- Kingdom: Animalia
- Phylum: Arthropoda
- Class: Insecta
- Order: Coleoptera
- Suborder: Polyphaga
- Infraorder: Cucujiformia
- Family: Cerambycidae
- Subfamily: Lamiinae
- Genus: Pseudestoloides; Breuning & Heyrovsky, 1961

Genus of beetles

Pseudestoloides is a genus of longhorn beetles of the subfamily Lamiinae, containing the following species:

- Pseudestoloides affinis Martins & Galileo, 2009
- Pseudestoloides bingkirki Santos-Silva, Wappes & Galileo, 2018
- Pseudestoloides costaricensis Breuning & Heyrovsky, 1961
- Pseudestoloides hiekei Breuning, 1974
- Pseudestoloides rubiginosa Martins & Galileo, 2009
