= Egesina ceylonensis =

Scientific classification
- Kingdom: Animalia
- Phylum: Arthropoda
- Class: Insecta
- Order: Coleoptera
- Suborder: Polyphaga
- Infraorder: Cucujiformia
- Family: Cerambycidae
- Genus: Egesina
- Species: E. ceylonensis

Binomial name
- Egesina ceylonensis Breuning, 1960

Species of beetle

Egesina ceylonensis is a species of beetle in the family Cerambycidae. It was described by Stephan von Breuning in 1960.
