= Dystasia sibuyana =

Scientific classification
- Kingdom: Animalia
- Phylum: Arthropoda
- Class: Insecta
- Order: Coleoptera
- Suborder: Polyphaga
- Infraorder: Cucujiformia
- Family: Cerambycidae
- Genus: Dystasia
- Species: D. sibuyana

Binomial name
- Dystasia sibuyana (Aurivillius, 1927)

Synonyms
- Dystasia curvipes Breuning, 1938; Spiniscapus sibuyana Aurivillius, 1927

Species of beetle

Dystasia sibuyana is a species of beetle in the family Cerambycidae. It was described by Per Olof Christopher Aurivillius in 1927. It is known from Malaysia, the Philippines and Borneo.
