= Ataxia setulosa =

Scientific classification
- Domain: Eukaryota
- Kingdom: Animalia
- Phylum: Arthropoda
- Class: Insecta
- Order: Coleoptera
- Suborder: Polyphaga
- Infraorder: Cucujiformia
- Family: Cerambycidae
- Tribe: Pteropliini
- Genus: Ataxia
- Species: A. setulosa

Binomial name
- Ataxia setulosa Fall, 1907

Species of beetle

Ataxia setulosa is a species of beetle in the family Cerambycidae. It was described by Fall in 1907. On males, the antennae are slightly longer than the body. It is native to Baja California.
