= Ataxia stehliki =

Scientific classification
- Kingdom: Animalia
- Phylum: Arthropoda
- Clade: Pancrustacea
- Class: Insecta
- Order: Coleoptera
- Suborder: Polyphaga
- Infraorder: Cucujiformia
- Family: Cerambycidae
- Genus: Ataxia
- Species: A. stehliki

Binomial name
- Ataxia stehliki Chemsak, 1966

Species of beetle

Ataxia stehliki is a species of beetle in the family Cerambycidae. It was described by Chemsak in 1966. It has been found in Cuba, Florida, the British West Indies, and The Bahamas.
