= Egesina picea =

Scientific classification
- Kingdom: Animalia
- Phylum: Arthropoda
- Class: Insecta
- Order: Coleoptera
- Suborder: Polyphaga
- Infraorder: Cucujiformia
- Family: Cerambycidae
- Genus: Egesina
- Species: E. picea

Binomial name
- Egesina picea Hayashi, 1962

Species of beetle

Egesina picea is a species of beetle in the family Cerambycidae. It was described by Masao Hayashi in 1962.
