= Dystasia semicana =

Scientific classification
- Kingdom: Animalia
- Phylum: Arthropoda
- Class: Insecta
- Order: Coleoptera
- Suborder: Polyphaga
- Infraorder: Cucujiformia
- Family: Cerambycidae
- Genus: Dystasia
- Species: D. semicana

Binomial name
- Dystasia semicana Pascoe, 1864

Synonyms
- Dystasia mindanaonis Breuning, 1980; Spiniscapus semigriseus Aurivillius, 1927

Species of beetle

Dystasia semicana is a species of beetle in the family Cerambycidae. It was described by Francis Polkinghorne Pascoe in 1864.
