= Egesina javanica =

Scientific classification
- Kingdom: Animalia
- Phylum: Arthropoda
- Class: Insecta
- Order: Coleoptera
- Suborder: Polyphaga
- Infraorder: Cucujiformia
- Family: Cerambycidae
- Genus: Egesina
- Species: E. javanica

Binomial name
- Egesina javanica Breuning, 1961

Species of beetle

Egesina javanica is a species of beetle in the family Cerambycidae. It was described by Stephan von Breuning in 1961.
