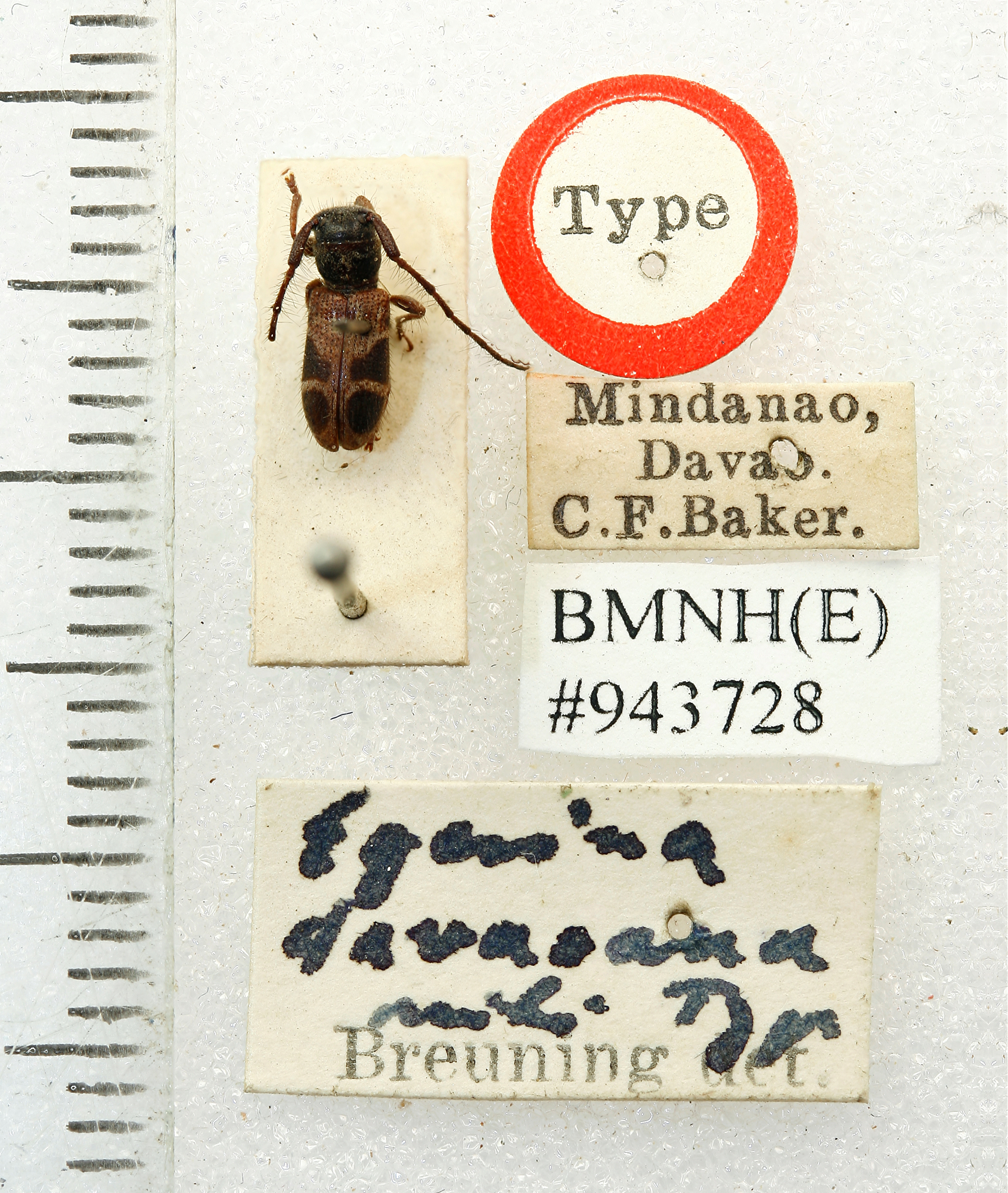

Scientific classification
- Kingdom: Animalia
- Phylum: Arthropoda
- Class: Insecta
- Order: Coleoptera
- Suborder: Polyphaga
- Infraorder: Cucujiformia
- Family: Cerambycidae
- Genus: Egesina
- Species: E. davaoana

Binomial name
- Egesina davaoana Breuning, 1948

= Egesina davaoana =

Species of beetle

Egesina davaoana is a species of beetle in the family Cerambycidae. It was described by Stephan von Breuning in 1948. It is known from the Philippines.
