= Egesina subfasciata =

Scientific classification
- Kingdom: Animalia
- Phylum: Arthropoda
- Class: Insecta
- Order: Coleoptera
- Suborder: Polyphaga
- Infraorder: Cucujiformia
- Family: Cerambycidae
- Genus: Egesina
- Species: E. subfasciata

Binomial name
- Egesina subfasciata (Pic, 1926)

Synonyms
- Gyaritus subfasciatus Pic, 1926; Egesina cleroides (Gahan) Breuning, 1963

Species of beetle

Egesina subfasciata is a species of beetle in the family Cerambycidae. It was described by Maurice Pic in 1926. It is known from Thailand, Vietnam, China, and Laos.
