= Egesina fujiwarai =

Scientific classification
- Domain: Eukaryota
- Kingdom: Animalia
- Phylum: Arthropoda
- Class: Insecta
- Order: Coleoptera
- Suborder: Polyphaga
- Infraorder: Cucujiformia
- Family: Cerambycidae
- Tribe: Pteropliini
- Genus: Egesina
- Species: E. fujiwarai

Binomial name
- Egesina fujiwarai Toyoshima, 1999

Species of beetle

Egesina fujiwarai is a species of beetle in the family Cerambycidae. It was described by Toyoshima in 1999.
