= Ataxia acutipennis =

Scientific classification
- Domain: Eukaryota
- Kingdom: Animalia
- Phylum: Arthropoda
- Class: Insecta
- Order: Coleoptera
- Suborder: Polyphaga
- Infraorder: Cucujiformia
- Family: Cerambycidae
- Tribe: Pteropliini
- Genus: Ataxia
- Species: A. acutipennis

Binomial name
- Ataxia acutipennis (Thomson, 1868)

Synonyms
- Bisaltes acutipennis Thomson, 1868

Species of beetle

Ataxia acutipennis is a species of beetle in the family Cerambycidae. It was described by James Thomson in 1868. It is known from Brazil.
