= Ataxia obscura =

Scientific classification
- Domain: Eukaryota
- Kingdom: Animalia
- Phylum: Arthropoda
- Class: Insecta
- Order: Coleoptera
- Suborder: Polyphaga
- Infraorder: Cucujiformia
- Family: Cerambycidae
- Tribe: Pteropliini
- Genus: Ataxia
- Species: A. obscura

Binomial name
- Ataxia obscura (Fabricius, 1801)

Synonyms
- Ataxia flaviceps Breuning, 1942; Esthlogena sulcata Bates, 1866; Parysatis collaris Thomson, 1868; Parysatis obscura Aurivillius, 1922; Parysatis sulcata Aurivillius, 1922; Stenochorus obscurus Schönherr, 1817; Stenocorus obscurus Fabricius, 1801

Species of beetle

Ataxia obscura is a species of beetle in the family Cerambycidae. It was described by Johan Christian Fabricius in 1801. It is known from Ecuador, Brazil and French Guiana.
