= Ataxia canescens =

Scientific classification
- Domain: Eukaryota
- Kingdom: Animalia
- Phylum: Arthropoda
- Class: Insecta
- Order: Coleoptera
- Suborder: Polyphaga
- Infraorder: Cucujiformia
- Family: Cerambycidae
- Tribe: Pteropliini
- Genus: Ataxia
- Species: A. canescens

Binomial name
- Ataxia canescens (Bates, 1880)

Synonyms
- Parysatis canescens Bates, 1880

Species of beetle

Ataxia canescens is a species of beetle in the family Cerambycidae. It was described by Henry Walter Bates in 1880. It is known from Honduras and Mexico.
