= Ataxia brunnea =

Scientific classification
- Domain: Eukaryota
- Kingdom: Animalia
- Phylum: Arthropoda
- Class: Insecta
- Order: Coleoptera
- Suborder: Polyphaga
- Infraorder: Cucujiformia
- Family: Cerambycidae
- Tribe: Pteropliini
- Genus: Ataxia
- Species: A. brunnea

Binomial name
- Ataxia brunnea Champlain & Knull, 1926

Synonyms
- Ataxia brunneus Champlain & Knull, 1926; Esthlogena brunnea Breuning, 1961

Species of beetle

Ataxia brunnea is a species of beetle in the family Cerambycidae. It was described by Champlain and Knull in 1926. It is known from the United States.
