= Egesina bhutanensis =

Scientific classification
- Kingdom: Animalia
- Phylum: Arthropoda
- Class: Insecta
- Order: Coleoptera
- Suborder: Polyphaga
- Infraorder: Cucujiformia
- Family: Cerambycidae
- Genus: Egesina
- Species: E. bhutanensis

Binomial name
- Egesina bhutanensis (Breuning, 1975)

Synonyms
- Similosodus bhutanensis Breuning, 1975

Species of beetle

Egesina bhutanensis is a species of beetle in the family Cerambycidae. It was described by Stephan von Breuning in 1975. It is known from Bhutan.
