= Egesina callosa =

Scientific classification
- Domain: Eukaryota
- Kingdom: Animalia
- Phylum: Arthropoda
- Class: Insecta
- Order: Coleoptera
- Suborder: Polyphaga
- Infraorder: Cucujiformia
- Family: Cerambycidae
- Tribe: Pteropliini
- Genus: Egesina
- Species: E. callosa

Binomial name
- Egesina callosa (Pascoe, 1866)

Synonyms
- Cuphisia callosa Pascoe, 1866

Species of beetle

Egesina callosa is a species of beetle in the family Cerambycidae. It was described by Francis Polkinghorne Pascoe in 1866. It is known from Malaysia.
