= Egesina sericans =

Scientific classification
- Kingdom: Animalia
- Phylum: Arthropoda
- Class: Insecta
- Order: Coleoptera
- Suborder: Polyphaga
- Infraorder: Cucujiformia
- Family: Cerambycidae
- Genus: Egesina
- Species: E. sericans

Binomial name
- Egesina sericans Breuning, 1939

Species of beetle

Egesina sericans is a species of beetle in the family Cerambycidae. It was described by Stephan von Breuning in 1939.
