= Ataxia tibialis =

Scientific classification
- Domain: Eukaryota
- Kingdom: Animalia
- Phylum: Arthropoda
- Class: Insecta
- Order: Coleoptera
- Suborder: Polyphaga
- Infraorder: Cucujiformia
- Family: Cerambycidae
- Tribe: Pteropliini
- Genus: Ataxia
- Species: A. tibialis

Binomial name
- Ataxia tibialis Schaeffer, 1908

Species of beetle

Ataxia tibialis is a species of beetle in the family Cerambycidae. It was described by Schaeffer in 1908. It is known from the United States.
