= Egesina digitata =

Scientific classification
- Domain: Eukaryota
- Kingdom: Animalia
- Phylum: Arthropoda
- Class: Insecta
- Order: Coleoptera
- Suborder: Polyphaga
- Infraorder: Cucujiformia
- Family: Cerambycidae
- Tribe: Pteropliini
- Genus: Egesina
- Species: E. digitata

Binomial name
- Egesina digitata Pesarini & Sabbadini, 1999

Species of beetle

Egesina digitata is a species of beetle in the family Cerambycidae. It was described by Pesarini and Sabbadini in 1999.
