= Dystasia similis =

Scientific classification
- Domain: Eukaryota
- Kingdom: Animalia
- Phylum: Arthropoda
- Class: Insecta
- Order: Coleoptera
- Suborder: Polyphaga
- Infraorder: Cucujiformia
- Family: Cerambycidae
- Tribe: Pteropliini
- Genus: Dystasia
- Species: D. similis

Binomial name
- Dystasia similis Gahan, 1907

Species of beetle

Dystasia similis is a species of beetle in the family Cerambycidae. It was described by Charles Joseph Gahan in 1907.
