= Pseudestoloides affinis =

Scientific classification
- Kingdom: Animalia
- Phylum: Arthropoda
- Class: Insecta
- Order: Coleoptera
- Suborder: Polyphaga
- Infraorder: Cucujiformia
- Family: Cerambycidae
- Genus: Pseudestoloides
- Species: P. affinis

Binomial name
- Pseudestoloides affinis Martins & Galileo, 2009

Species of beetle

Pseudestoloides affinis is a species of beetle in the family Cerambycidae. It was described by Martins and Galileo in 2009. It is known from Costa Rica.
