= Ataxia fulvifrons =

Scientific classification
- Domain: Eukaryota
- Kingdom: Animalia
- Phylum: Arthropoda
- Class: Insecta
- Order: Coleoptera
- Suborder: Polyphaga
- Infraorder: Cucujiformia
- Family: Cerambycidae
- Tribe: Pteropliini
- Genus: Ataxia
- Species: A. fulvifrons

Binomial name
- Ataxia fulvifrons (Bates, 1885)

Synonyms
- Parysatis fulvifrons Bates, 1885

Species of beetle

Ataxia fulvifrons is a species of beetle in the family Cerambycidae. It was described by Henry Walter Bates in 1885. It is known from Panama and Costa Rica.
