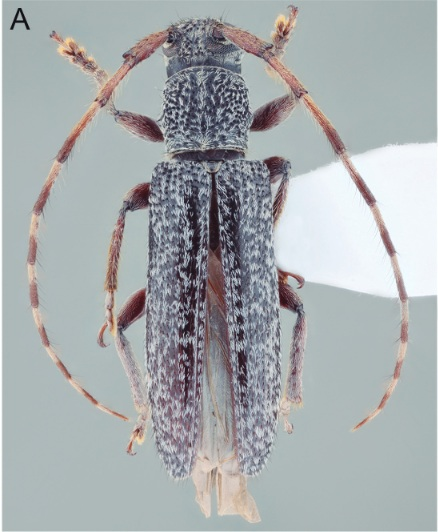

Scientific classification
- Kingdom: Animalia
- Phylum: Arthropoda
- Clade: Pancrustacea
- Class: Insecta
- Order: Coleoptera
- Suborder: Polyphaga
- Infraorder: Cucujiformia
- Family: Cerambycidae
- Genus: Ataxia
- Species: A. obtusa

Binomial name
- Ataxia obtusa (Bates, 1866)

Synonyms
- Esthlogena brunnipes Lacordaire, 1872; Esthlogena obtusa Bates, 1866; Parysatis obtusa Aurivillius, 1922

= Ataxia obtusa =

Species of beetle

Ataxia obtusa is a species of beetle in the family Cerambycidae. It was described by Henry Walter Bates in 1866. It is known from Brazil (Espírito Santo, Rio de Janeiro, São Paulo, Paraná, Santa Catarina, Rio Grande do Sul), Bolivia (Santa Cruz) and Paraguay.
