= Egesina cleroides =

Scientific classification
- Domain: Eukaryota
- Kingdom: Animalia
- Phylum: Arthropoda
- Class: Insecta
- Order: Coleoptera
- Suborder: Polyphaga
- Infraorder: Cucujiformia
- Family: Cerambycidae
- Tribe: Pteropliini
- Genus: Egesina
- Species: E. cleroides

Binomial name
- Egesina cleroides (Gahan, 1890)

Synonyms
- Enispia cleroides Gahan, 1890; Enispia formosana Gressitt, 1951

Species of beetle

Egesina cleroides is a species of beetle in the family Cerambycidae. It was described by Charles Joseph Gahan in 1890. It is known from Myanmar and India.
