= Dystasia laterivitta =

Scientific classification
- Kingdom: Animalia
- Phylum: Arthropoda
- Class: Insecta
- Order: Coleoptera
- Suborder: Polyphaga
- Infraorder: Cucujiformia
- Family: Cerambycidae
- Genus: Dystasia
- Species: D. laterivitta

Binomial name
- Dystasia laterivitta (Breuning, 1942)

Species of beetle

Dystasia laterivitta is a species of beetle in the family Cerambycidae. It was described by Stephan von Breuning in 1942.
