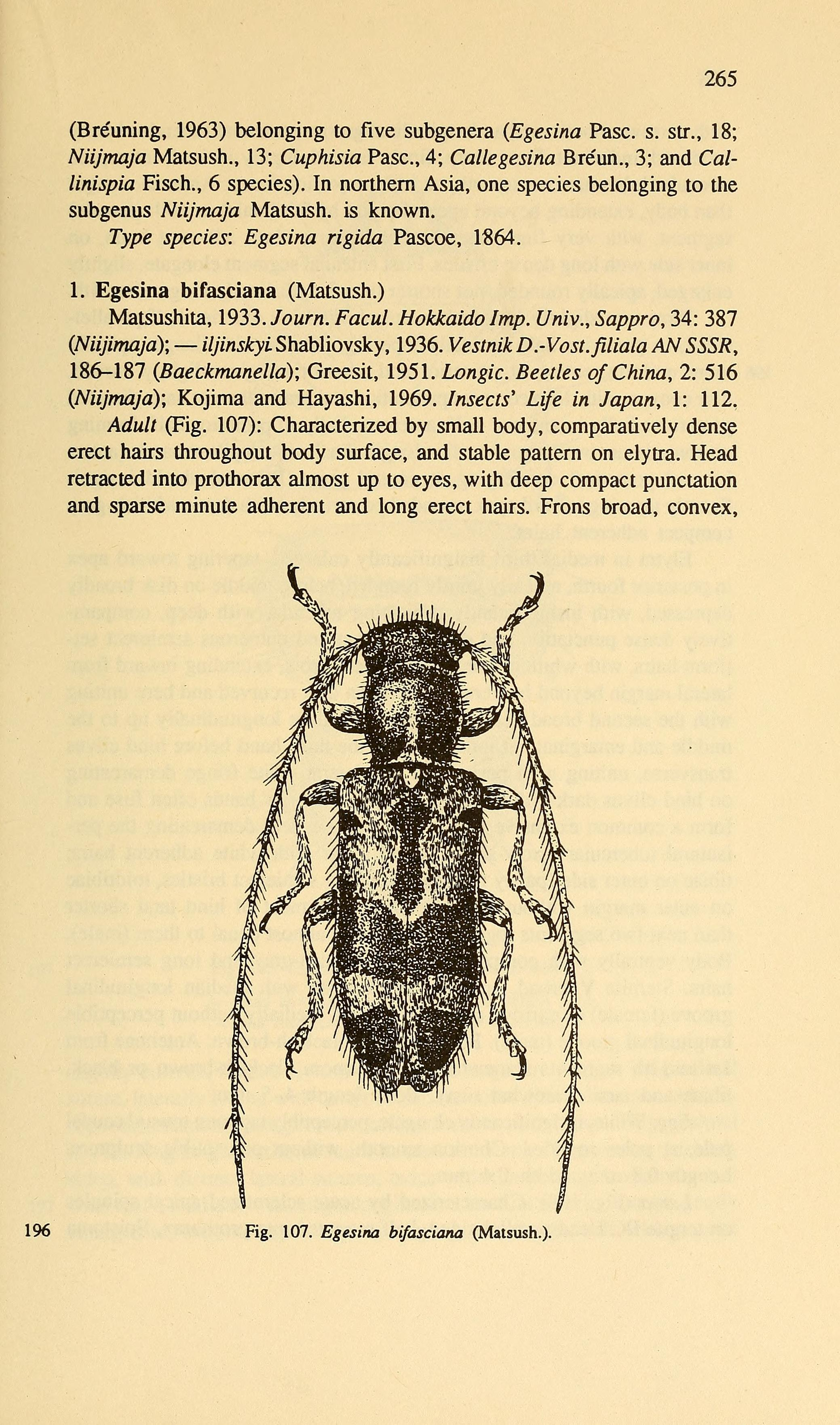

Scientific classification
- Domain: Eukaryota
- Kingdom: Animalia
- Phylum: Arthropoda
- Class: Insecta
- Order: Coleoptera
- Suborder: Polyphaga
- Infraorder: Cucujiformia
- Family: Cerambycidae
- Tribe: Pteropliini
- Genus: Egesina
- Species: E. bifasciana

Binomial name
- Egesina bifasciana Matsushita, 1933

= Egesina bifasciana =

Species of beetle

Egesina bifasciana is a species of beetle in the family Cerambycidae. It was described by Masaki Matsushita in 1933.

== Subspecies ==
- Egesina bifasciana bifasciana Matsushita, 1933
- Egesina bifasciana tsushimae Breuning & Ohbayashi, 1964
