= Egesina laosiana =

Scientific classification
- Kingdom: Animalia
- Phylum: Arthropoda
- Class: Insecta
- Order: Coleoptera
- Suborder: Polyphaga
- Infraorder: Cucujiformia
- Family: Cerambycidae
- Genus: Egesina
- Species: E. laosiana

Binomial name
- Egesina laosiana Breuning, 1982

Species of beetle

Egesina laosiana is a species of beetle in the family Cerambycidae. It was described by Stephan von Breuning in 1982.
