= Ataxia perplexa =

Scientific classification
- Kingdom: Animalia
- Phylum: Arthropoda
- Class: Insecta
- Order: Coleoptera
- Suborder: Polyphaga
- Infraorder: Cucujiformia
- Family: Cerambycidae
- Genus: Ataxia
- Species: A. perplexa

Binomial name
- Ataxia perplexa (Gahan, 1892)

Synonyms
- Parysatis perplexa Gahan, 1892

Species of beetle

Ataxia perplexa is a species of beetle in the family Cerambycidae. It was described by Charles Joseph Gahan in 1892. It is known to be from Mexico.
