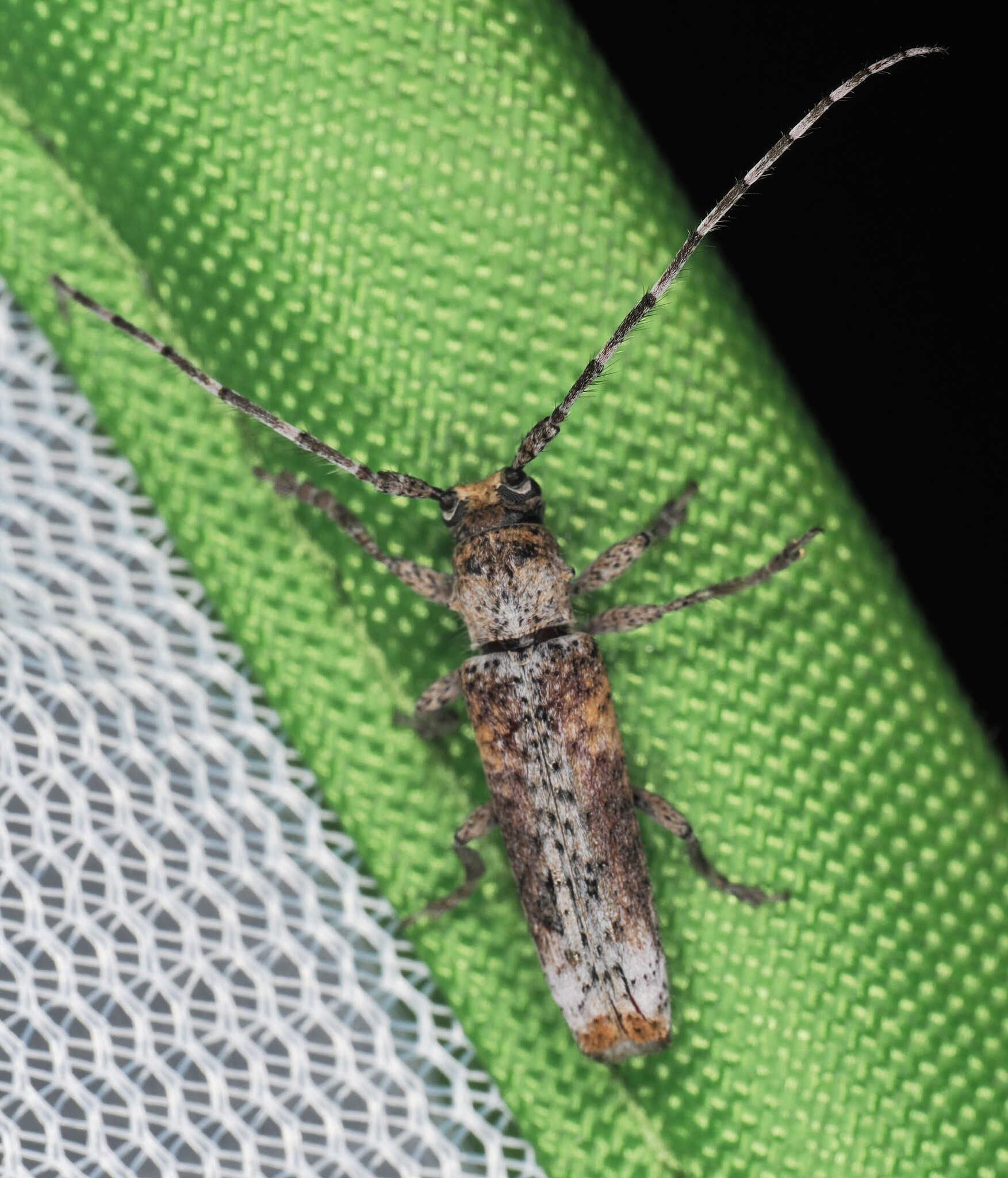

Scientific classification
- Kingdom: Animalia
- Phylum: Arthropoda
- Clade: Pancrustacea
- Class: Insecta
- Order: Coleoptera
- Suborder: Polyphaga
- Infraorder: Cucujiformia
- Family: Cerambycidae
- Genus: Ataxia
- Species: A. luteifrons

Binomial name
- Ataxia luteifrons (Bruch, 1926)

Synonyms
- Ataxia strandi Breuning, 1940; Parepectasis luteifrons Bruch, 1926

= Ataxia luteifrons =

Species of beetle

Ataxia luteifrons is a species of beetle in the family Cerambycidae. It was first described by Bruch in 1926 an is known from Argentina and Paraguay. It feeds on Schinopsis balansae and Schinopsis quebracho-colorado.
