= Egesina cylindrica =

Scientific classification
- Domain: Eukaryota
- Kingdom: Animalia
- Phylum: Arthropoda
- Class: Insecta
- Order: Coleoptera
- Suborder: Polyphaga
- Infraorder: Cucujiformia
- Family: Cerambycidae
- Tribe: Pteropliini
- Genus: Egesina
- Species: E. cylindrica

Binomial name
- Egesina cylindrica Aurivillius, 1924

Species of beetle

Egesina cylindrica is a species of beetle in the family Cerambycidae. It was described by Per Olof Christopher Aurivillius in 1924.
