= Dystasia =

Scientific classification
- Kingdom: Animalia
- Phylum: Arthropoda
- Class: Insecta
- Order: Coleoptera
- Suborder: Polyphaga
- Infraorder: Cucujiformia
- Family: Cerambycidae
- Tribe: Pteropliini
- Genus: Dystasia

Genus of beetles

Dystasia is a genus of longhorn beetles of the subfamily Lamiinae, containing the following species:

- Dystasia affinis Gahan, 1906
- Dystasia bella (Breuning, 1940)
- Dystasia chassoti Breuning, 1973
- Dystasia circulata Pascoe, 1864
- Dystasia cristata Fisher, 1933
- Dystasia grisescens Breuning, 1954
- Dystasia humeralis Breuning, 1958
- Dystasia javanica Breuning, 1938
- Dystasia laterivitta (Breuning, 1942)
- Dystasia multifasciculata Breuning, 1943
- Dystasia niasensis Breuning, 1943
- Dystasia nubila Pascoe, 1886
- Dystasia proxima Breuning, 1938
- Dystasia pygmaeola (Breuning, 1938)
- Dystasia quadratiplagiata (Breuning, 1938)
- Dystasia semicana Pascoe, 1864
- Dystasia siamensis Breuning, 1938
- Dystasia sibuyana (Aurivillius, 1927)
- Dystasia similis Gahan, 1907
- Dystasia siporensis Breuning, 1939
- Dystasia subcristata Breuning, 1938
- Dystasia subuniformis Breuning, 1938
- Dystasia tonkinea (Pic, 1930)
- Dystasia valida Breuning, 1937
- Dystasia variegata Fisher, 1936
