= Ataxia rufitarsis =

Scientific classification
- Kingdom: Animalia
- Phylum: Arthropoda
- Class: Insecta
- Order: Coleoptera
- Suborder: Polyphaga
- Infraorder: Cucujiformia
- Family: Cerambycidae
- Genus: Ataxia
- Species: A. rufitarsis

Binomial name
- Ataxia rufitarsis (Bates, 1880)

Synonyms
- Parysatis rufitarsis Bates, 1880

Species of beetle

Ataxia rufitarsis is a species of beetle in the family Cerambycidae. It was described by Henry Walter Bates in 1880. It is known from Nicaragua.

Ataxia rufitarsis measure about 12.7 mm (0.50 in) in length.
