= Ataxia cayensis =

Scientific classification
- Domain: Eukaryota
- Kingdom: Animalia
- Phylum: Arthropoda
- Class: Insecta
- Order: Coleoptera
- Suborder: Polyphaga
- Infraorder: Cucujiformia
- Family: Cerambycidae
- Tribe: Pteropliini
- Genus: Ataxia
- Species: A. cayensis

Binomial name
- Ataxia cayensis Chemsak & Feller, 1988

Species of beetle

Ataxia cayensis is a species of beetle in the family Cerambycidae. It was described by Chemsak and Feller in 1988. It is known from Belize.
