= Egesina setosa =

Scientific classification
- Domain: Eukaryota
- Kingdom: Animalia
- Phylum: Arthropoda
- Class: Insecta
- Order: Coleoptera
- Suborder: Polyphaga
- Infraorder: Cucujiformia
- Family: Cerambycidae
- Tribe: Pteropliini
- Genus: Egesina
- Species: E. setosa

Binomial name
- Egesina setosa (Gressitt, 1937)

Species of beetle

Egesina setosa is a species of beetle in the family Cerambycidae. It was described by Gressitt in 1937.
