= Dystasia valida =

Scientific classification
- Kingdom: Animalia
- Phylum: Arthropoda
- Class: Insecta
- Order: Coleoptera
- Suborder: Polyphaga
- Infraorder: Cucujiformia
- Family: Cerambycidae
- Genus: Dystasia
- Species: D. valida

Binomial name
- Dystasia valida Breuning, 1937

Species of beetle

Dystasia valida is a species of beetle in the family Cerambycidae. It was described by Stephan von Breuning in 1937. It is known from Borneo.
