= Ataxia illita =

Scientific classification
- Kingdom: Animalia
- Phylum: Arthropoda
- Class: Insecta
- Order: Coleoptera
- Suborder: Polyphaga
- Infraorder: Cucujiformia
- Family: Cerambycidae
- Tribe: Pteropliini
- Genus: Ataxia
- Species: A. illita

Binomial name
- Ataxia illita (Bates, 1885)

Synonyms
- Parysatis illita Bates, 1885

Species of beetle

Ataxia illita is a species of beetle in the family Cerambycidae. It was described by Henry Walter Bates in 1885. It is known from Guatemala.
