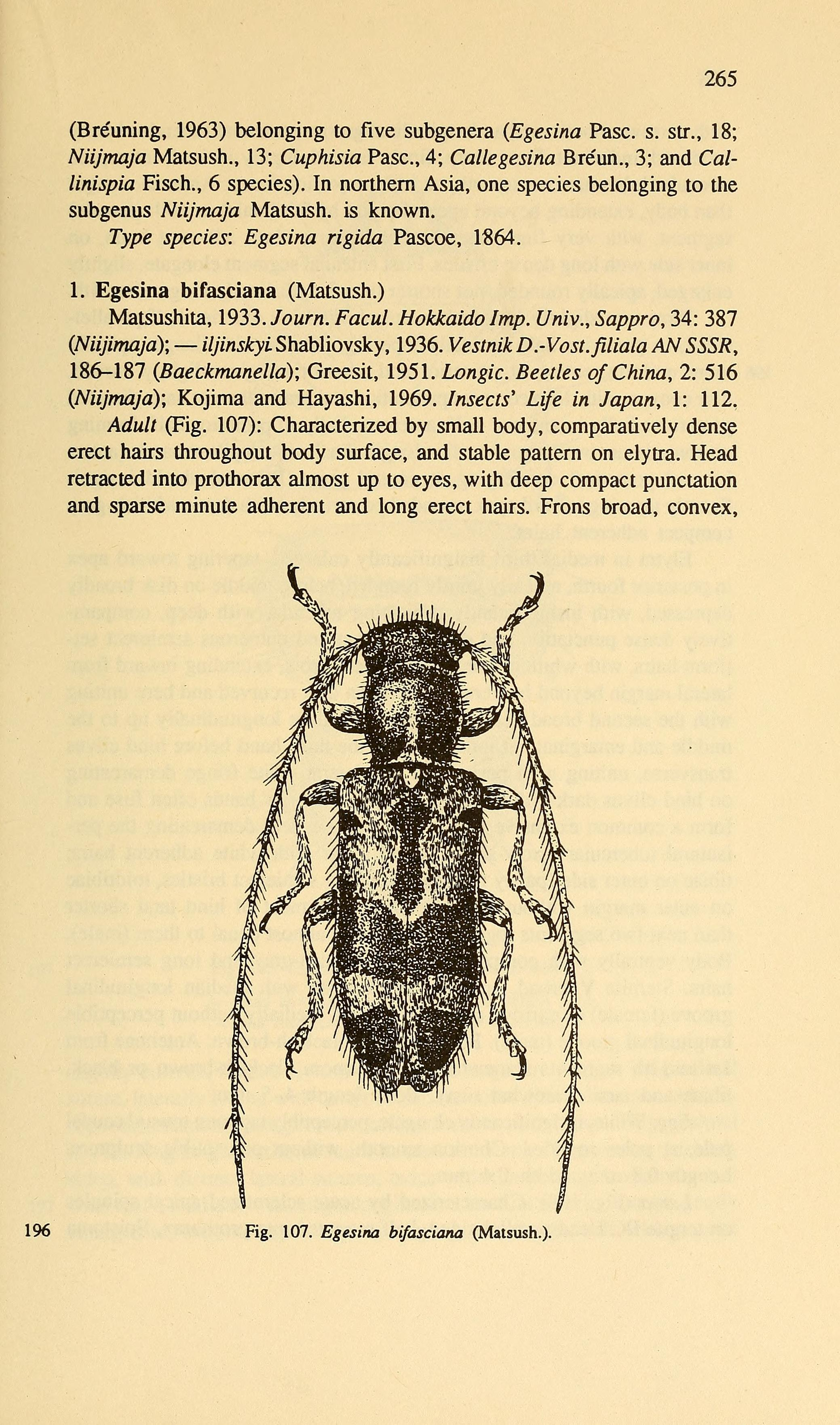
- Egesina bifasciana

Scientific classification
- Domain: Eukaryota
- Kingdom: Animalia
- Phylum: Arthropoda
- Class: Insecta
- Order: Coleoptera
- Suborder: Polyphaga
- Infraorder: Cucujiformia
- Family: Cerambycidae
- Subfamily: Lamiinae
- Tribe: Pteropliini
- Genus: Egesina; Pascoe, 1864

Species
- See text

= Egesina =

Genus of beetles

Egesina is a genus of longhorn beetles of the subfamily Lamiinae, containing the following species:

subgenus Callegesina

- Egesina anfracta (Gressitt, 1940)
- Egesina sarawakensis Breuning, 1943
- Egesina vitticollis Breuning, 1943

subgenus Callienispia

- Egesina anterufipennis Breuning, 1958
- Egesina cruciata Breuning, 1938
- Egesina elegans (Fisher, 1925)
- Egesina minuta (Fisher, 1925)
- Egesina monticola (Fisher, 1936)
- Egesina mystica Breuning, 1938
- Egesina pascoei Breuning, 1961

subgenus Cuphisia

- Egesina callosa (Pascoe, 1866)
- Egesina cleroides (Gahan, 1890)
- Egesina diffusa Holzschuh, 2007
- Egesina digitata Pesarini & Sabbadini, 1999
- Egesina guerryi (Pic, 1926)
- Egesina mjobergi Breuning, 1950
- Egesina salicivora Holzschuh, 2007
- Egesina subfasciata (Pic, 1926)
- Egesina tarsata Holzschuh, 2007

subgenus Egesina

- Egesina albolineata Breuning, 1942
- Egesina albomaculata (Fisher, 1925)
- Egesina anterufulipennis Breuning, 1961
- Egesina aspersa Holzschuh, 1998
- Egesina bakeri (Fisher, 1925)
- Egesina basirufa Breuning & Heyrovsky, 1961
- Egesina bhutanensis (Breuning, 1975)
- Egesina ceylonensis Breuning, 1960
- Egesina cylindrica Aurivillius, 1924
- Egesina davaoana Breuning, 1948
- Egesina fuchsi Breuning, 1970
- Egesina fusca (Fisher, 1925)
- Egesina generosa Holzschuh, 2003
- Egesina gracilicornis Breuning, 1940
- Egesina javana (Fisher, 1934)
- Egesina javanica Breuning, 1961
- Egesina lacertosa Holzschuh, 2007
- Egesina lanigera Holzschuh, 2007
- Egesina laosiana Breuning, 1982
- Egesina malaccensis Breuning, 1938
- Egesina mentaweiensis Breuning, 1943
- Egesina ornata (Fisher, 1925)
- Egesina picina Holzschuh, 2007
- Egesina postvittata Breuning, 1940
- Egesina rigida Pascoe, 1864
- Egesina setosa (Gressitt, 1937)
- Egesina siamensis Breuning, 1938
- Egesina umbrina Holzschuh, 2007
- Egesina varia (Fisher, 1925)

subgenus Niijimaia

- Egesina albomarmorata Breuning, 1938
- Egesina bifasciana Matsushita, 1933
- Egesina flavoapicalis Hayashi, 1971
- Egesina flavopicta Breuning & Heyrovsky, 1961
- Egesina formosana (Schwarzer, 1925)
- Egesina fujiwarai Toyoshima, 1999
- Egesina gilmouri Breuning, 1962
- Egesina grossepunctata Breuning, 1963
- Egesina indica Breuning, 1938
- Egesina modiglianii Breuning, 1943
- Egesina ochraceovittata Breuning, 1938
- Egesina picea Hayashi, 1962
- Egesina picta Breuning, 1940
- Egesina pseudocallosa Breuning, 1961
- Egesina sericans Breuning, 1939
- Egesina shibatai Hayashi, 1962
- Egesina sikkimensis Breuning, 1940
- Egesina tsushimae Breuning & Ohbayashi, 1964
