= Ataxia spinicauda =

Scientific classification
- Domain: Eukaryota
- Kingdom: Animalia
- Phylum: Arthropoda
- Class: Insecta
- Order: Coleoptera
- Suborder: Polyphaga
- Infraorder: Cucujiformia
- Family: Cerambycidae
- Tribe: Pteropliini
- Genus: Ataxia
- Species: A. spinicauda

Binomial name
- Ataxia spinicauda Schaeffer, 1904

Species of beetle

Ataxia spinicauda is a species of beetle in the family Cerambycidae. It was described by Schaeffer in 1904. It is known from the Bahamas, Cuba, Jamaica and the United States.
