= Hebestola =

Scientific classification
- Kingdom: Animalia
- Phylum: Arthropoda
- Class: Insecta
- Order: Coleoptera
- Suborder: Polyphaga
- Infraorder: Cucujiformia
- Family: Cerambycidae
- Genus: Hebestola
- Species: H. nebulosa

Binomial name
- Hebestola nebulosa Haldeman, 1847

Genus of beetles

Hebestola nebulosa is a species of beetle in the family Cerambycidae, and the only species in the genus Hebestola. It was described by Haldeman in 1847.
