= Leopold Heyrovský =

Czech lawyer and entomologist (1892–1976)

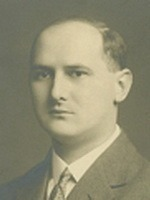
Heyrovský in 1922

Leopold "Leo" Heyrovský (25 November 1892 – 29 June 1976) was a Czech lawyer and entomologist. He specialized in the long-horned beetles of the region. He was a brother of the Nobel Prize winning chemist Jaroslav Heyrovský.

== Biography ==
Heyrovský was born in Prague where his father Dr Leopold Heyrovský (1852–1924) was professor of law. He had four other siblings including his older brother Jaroslav who won the Nobel Prize in Chemistry in 1959. After studying at a gymnasium in Prague, he followed his father to study law at the Charles University in Prague. His studies were interrupted by World War I and he joined military service in 1915, posted into the South Tyrol. He was demobilized at the end of the war with the rank of a cavalry captain and completed his education. He worked in the ministry of education in 1920 and then practiced law. He was deeply involved in his entomological pursuits, becoming a member of the Czech entomological society from 1908. During World War II, he collected beetles across Europe and northern Africa, adding nearly 8000 specimens. Many species have been described from his collections including Alocoderus heyrovskyi Balthasar, 1935 and Harpalus heyrovskyi Jedlička, 1928. He wrote a monograph of the Cerambycidae of Czechoslovakia in 1955. His insect collections are now held in the National Museum in Prague and partly in the Silesian Museum in Opava.
