= Warren Samuel Fisher =

American entomologist

Warren Samuel Fisher (4 April, 1878–2 May, 1971) was an American entomologist who specialised in Coleoptera.

He was employed from 1912 to 1948 by the United States Department of Agriculture in the Bureau of Entomology, and served in the National Museum of Natural History in Washington. Fisher was especially interested in Buprestidae and Cerambycidae.
