= A. brunneus =

A. brunneus may refer to:

- Abacetus brunneus, a ground beetle
- Abraeus brunneus, a synonym of Parepierus brunneus, a clown beetle
- Acanthiophilus brunneus, a fruit fly found in Africa
- Aderpas brunneus, a longhorn beetle
- Agabus brunneus, the brown diving beetle, found in England
- Agniohammus brunneus, a longhorn beetle found in Borneo
- Allobates brunneus, the Chupada rocket frog, an amphibian found in South America
- Ameiurus brunneus, the snail bullhead, a freshwater fish found in the United States
  - Amiurus brunneus, a synonym of Ameiurus brunneus
- Andricus brunneus, the clustered gall wasp, found in North America
- Anolis brunneus, a lizard found in the Bahamas
- Apristurus brunneus, the brown catshark, found in the Pacific Ocean
- Aspergillus brunneus, a fungus
- Ataxia brunneus, a synonym of Ataxia brunnea, a longhorn beetle found in the United States
- Attagenus brunneus, a carpet beetle found in North America and Europe
