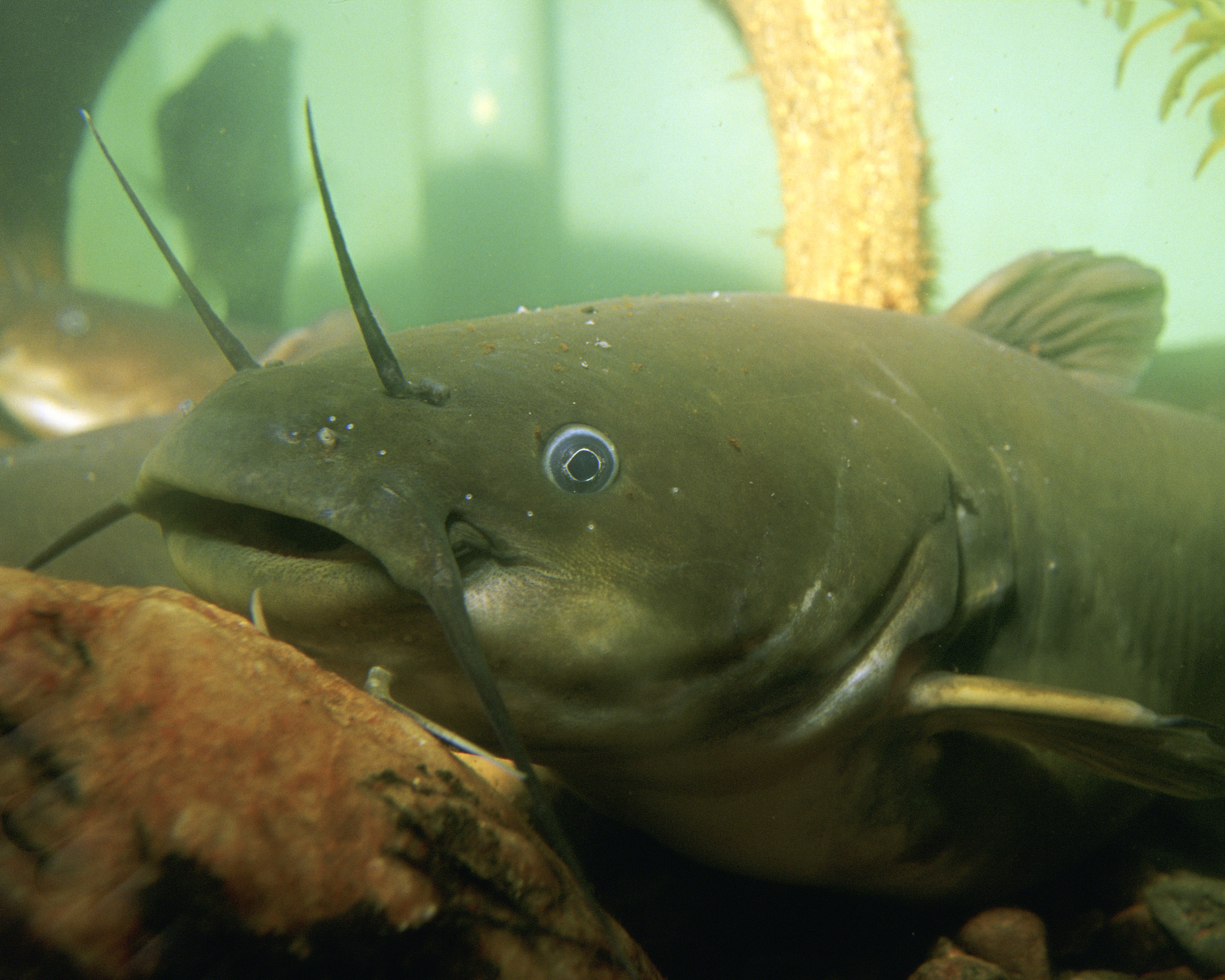

Conservation status
- Least Concern (IUCN 3.1)

Scientific classification
- Kingdom: Animalia
- Phylum: Chordata
- Class: Actinopterygii
- Order: Siluriformes
- Family: Ictaluridae
- Genus: Ameiurus
- Species: A. natalis

Binomial name
- Ameiurus natalis (Lesueur, 1819)

Synonyms
- Pimelodus natalis Lesueur, 1819; Silurus lividus Rafinesque, 1819; Silurus xanthocephalus Rafinesque, 1820; Silurus (Pimelodus) coenosus Richardson, 1837; Pimelodus felinus Girard, 1858; Pimelodus ailurus Girard, 1858; Pimelodus antoniensis Girard, 1858; Pimelodus catulus Girard, 1858; Pimelodus puma Girard, 1859; Amiurus erebennus Jordan, 1877; Amiurus bolli Cope, 1880; Amiurus prosthistius Cope, 1883

= Yellow bullhead =

Species of fish

The yellow bullhead (Ameiurus natalis) is a species of bullhead catfish, a ray-finned fish that lacks scales.

== Description ==
The yellow bullhead is a medium-sized member of the catfish family. It is typically yellow-olive to slate black on the back and may appear mottled depending on its habitat, though generally not as strongly as the brown bullhead (Ameiurus nebulosus). The sides are lighter and more yellowish, while the underside of the head and body are bright yellow, yellow white, or bright white. The rear edge of its caudal fin is rounded. The anal fin has anywhere between 24 and 27 constituent rays, more than that of other bullheads. The yellow bullhead can be easily distinguished from A. nebulosus and the black bullhead (A. melas) by the group of white barbels or "whiskers" under its chin. The pectoral spines are barbed posteriorly like those of the brown bullhead. Unlike flathead catfish (Pylodictis olivaris), there are no lateral extensions present on the upper (premaxillary) tooth patch. Its eyes are generally smaller than those of the snail bullhead (A. brunneus) or the flat bullhead (A. platycephalus) and there is no blotch at the base of the dorsal fin.

Yellow bullheads are medium-sized bullheads that rarely grow larger than 2 lb (0.91 kg), but can reach up to 6 lb 6 oz (2.89 kg). Yellow bullheads may grow to a maximum total length (TL) of 60 centimetres (24 in), though they are more commonly 22.5 centimetres (8.9 in) TL, and can live up to 12 years.

== Diet ==
The yellow bullhead is a voracious scavenger that will almost eat anything. It locates prey by brushing the stream bottom with its barbels. Taste buds on the barbels tell the yellow bullhead whether or not contact is made with edible prey. They typically feed at night on a variety of plant and animal material, both live and dead, most commonly consisting of worms, insects, snails, minnows, clams, crayfish, other small aquatic organisms, plant matter, and decaying animal matter. Compared to black and brown bullheads, yellow bullheads consume more aquatic vegetation.

== Habitat ==
Yellow bullhead are bottom dwellers, living in areas with muck, rock, sand, or clay substrates. Its habitat includes river pools, backwaters, and sluggish current over soft or mildly rocky substrate in creeks, small to larger rivers, and shallow portions of lakes and ponds. Their habitat can vary from a slow current with poorly oxygenated, highly silted, and highly polluted water to a more swift current with clean and clear water that has aquatic vegetation. Fishermen often find them in sluggish creeks and rivers with a gravel bottom.

== Reproduction and life cycle ==
Bullheads have a monogamous relationship with spawning beginning in mid-May or early-June, with both sexes participating in nest-building. Bullheads usually use a natural cavity or make saucer-shaped depressions near submerged cover, such as tree roots or sunken logs. The female will lay anywhere from 300 to 700 eggs at a time in a gelatinous mass, with up to 4300 eggs deposited into the nest in total. After fertilization the male protects and continually fans the nest of eggs. The eggs hatch in 5 to 7 days on average. Young fry are herded into tight schools by the male and are protected by both parents until they are approximately two inches long. They grow to about three inches by one year of age. Sexual maturity is achieved after two to three years, by which time the fish have reached 140 millimetres (5.5 in) in length.

== Distribution ==
Yellow bullhead have a wide range across the central and eastern US from the Rio Grande River to North Dakota and south-eastern Canada, and east through the Great Lakes region to the East Coast. They have also been introduced to the West and can be caught as far up as northern Washington state.

== Ecology ==
Ameiurus natalis can serve as a host to the glochidia—larvae of freshwater mussels of family Unionidae—of Cyclonaias tuberculata, Tritogonia verrucosa and Strophitus undulatus. It is additionally parasitized by leeches.

== Angling ==
Yellow bullheads are considered a minor game fish, and their meat is considered sweet and has a good flavor, but the meat can become soft in summer. They are not as sought after as other catfish. They can be caught on natural baits such as worms, crickets or chicken liver fished on the bottom at night.

== Etymology ==
Named both Ictalurus natalis and Ameiurus natalis. Ictalurus, Greek, meaning "fish cat"; Ameiurus, Greek, meaning "privative curtailed," in reference to the caudal fin lacking a notch; natalis, Latin, meaning "of birth." Charles Alexandre Lesueur, when he originally described the species in 1819, invented a common name Pimelode Noël, which likely commemorates the naturalist Simon Barthélemy Joseph Noël de la Morinière (1765–1822) and also may be the source of the specific name he assigned (from French: Noel), though it was not explicitly stated in either case.

== See also ==
- Bullhead catfish (general)

== Other sources ==
- "Ameiurus natalis". Integrated Taxonomic Information System.
- Froese, Rainer; Pauly, Daniel (eds.). "Ameiurus natalis". FishBase. May 2006 version.
- McClane, A.J. (1974). McClane's Field Guide to Freshwater Fishes of North America. New York: Henry Holt and Company. pp. 111–112. ISBN 0-8050-0194-8 – via Internet Archive.
- Earl J. S. Rook (1999). "A Boundary Waters Compendium". Rook.org. Archived from the original on 13 June 2007.
- Page, Lawrence; Burr, Brooks (1991). A Field Guide to Freshwater Fishes. Boston: Houghton Mifflin Company. pp. 193–194. ISBN 0-395-91091-9 – via Internet Archive.
- "Yellow Bullhead (Ameiurus natalis)". Texas Parks and Wildlife.
- "Fishing: Yellow Bullhead". Sport Fish Species. Arizona Game and Fish Department. 2023. Archived from the original on 26 March 2023.
