= Caerosternus =

Scientific classification
- Kingdom: Animalia
- Phylum: Arthropoda
- Clade: Pancrustacea
- Class: Insecta
- Order: Coleoptera
- Suborder: Polyphaga
- Infraorder: Staphyliniformia
- Family: Histeridae
- Subfamily: Tribalinae
- Genus: Caerosternus; J. L. LeConte, 1852

Genus of beetles

Caerosternus is a genus of clown beetles in the family Histeridae. There is one described species in Caerosternus, C. americanus. It is active during the night. It is found in the eastern United States to east Texas.
