= Plagiogramma =

Scientific classification
- Kingdom: Animalia
- Phylum: Arthropoda
- Class: Insecta
- Order: Coleoptera
- Suborder: Polyphaga
- Infraorder: Staphyliniformia
- Family: Histeridae
- Subfamily: Tribalinae
- Genus: Plagiogramma; Tarsia in Curia, 1935

Genus of beetles

Plagiogramma is a genus of clown beetles in the family Histeridae. There are more than 30 described species in Plagiogramma.

== Species ==
These 32 species belong to the genus Plagiogramma:

- Plagiogramma arciger (Marseul, 1854)
- Plagiogramma brasiliense Tarsia in Curia, 1935
- Plagiogramma caviscuta (Marseul, 1861)
- Plagiogramma coproides (Marseul, 1855)
- Plagiogramma darlingtoni (Wenzel, 1944)
- Plagiogramma epulo (Marseul, 1870)
- Plagiogramma fissus (Marseul, 1861)
- Plagiogramma fornicata (Marseul, 1887)
- Plagiogramma frater (Marseul, 1855)
- Plagiogramma frontale (Kirsch, 1866)
- Plagiogramma glabra (Bickhardt, 1911)
- Plagiogramma guyanense (Mazur, 1974)
- Plagiogramma hastata (Marseul, 1855)
- Plagiogramma incas (Marseul, 1855)
- Plagiogramma intermedia (Marseul, 1855)
- Plagiogramma leleupae (Wenzel, 1976)
- Plagiogramma lucens (Marseul, 1855)
- Plagiogramma marseulii (Kirsch, 1873)
- Plagiogramma mundus (Erichson, 1834)
- Plagiogramma nitescens (Marseul, 1861)
- Plagiogramma paradoxa Mazur, 1988
- Plagiogramma patruelis (Lewis, 1888)
- Plagiogramma peruana (Schmidt, 1889)
- Plagiogramma pubifrons (Hinton, 1935)
- Plagiogramma rhinocera (Marseul, 1870)
- Plagiogramma schmidti (Wenzel & Dybas, 1941)
- Plagiogramma singulistria (Hinton, 1935)
- Plagiogramma sphaerula (Marseul, 1870)
- Plagiogramma striatipyga (Wenzel, 1944)
- Plagiogramma subtropica (Casey, 1893)
- Plagiogramma tersus (Erichson, 1834)
- Plagiogramma trux (Marseul, 1861)
