= Epierus pulicarius =

Scientific classification
- Kingdom: Animalia
- Phylum: Arthropoda
- Class: Insecta
- Order: Coleoptera
- Suborder: Polyphaga
- Infraorder: Staphyliniformia
- Family: Histeridae
- Genus: Epierus
- Species: E. pulicarius

Binomial name
- Epierus pulicarius Erichson, 1834

Species of beetle

Epierus pulicarius is a species of clown beetle in the family Histeridae. It is found in North America.
