= Parepierus =

Scientific classification
- Kingdom: Animalia
- Phylum: Arthropoda
- Class: Insecta
- Order: Coleoptera
- Suborder: Polyphaga
- Infraorder: Staphyliniformia
- Family: Histeridae
- Subfamily: Tribalinae
- Genus: Parepierus; Bickhardt, 1913

Species
- See text

Genus of beetle

Parepierus is a genus of beetles.

== Species ==
As of 2024, thirty-two species are accepted within Parepierus:

- Parepierus abrogatus (Broun, 1886)
- Parepierus alutaceus Cooman, 1935
- Parepierus amandus (Schmidt, J. E. F., 1892)
- Parepierus arcuatus Bickhardt, 1913
- Parepierus brunneus (Broun, 1881)
- Parepierus chaostrius Cooman, 1935
- Parepierus chinensis Zhang, Ye-Jun & Hong-Zhang Zhou, 2007
- Parepierus corticicola Bickhardt, 1913
- Parepierus crenulatus (Broun, 1886)
- Parepierus foederatus (Lewis, 1900)
- Parepierus inaequispinus Zhang, Ye-Jun & Hong-Zhang Zhou, 2007
- Parepierus indiicola (Mazur, 1975)
- Parepierus kaszabi (Thérond, 1967)
- Parepierus lewisi Bickhardt, 1913
- Parepierus monticola (Schmidt, J. E. F., 1892)
- Parepierus opacipennis Bickhardt, 1918
- Parepierus orphanus Lewis, 1891
- Parepierus ovatulus Bickhardt, 1918
- Parepierus pectinispinus Zhang, Ye-Jun & Hong-Zhang Zhou, 2007
- Parepierus pinsapo (Mazur, 1979)
- Parepierus planiceps (Broun, 1886)
- Parepierus punctulipennis (Broun, 1880)
- Parepierus purus (Broun, 1880)
- Parepierus rufescens (Reitter, 1880)
- Parepierus rusticus (Broun, 1886)
- Parepierus salvazai (Desbordes, 1919)
- Parepierus silvaticus Cooman, 1935
- Parepierus simplex (Broun, 1886)
- Parepierus spinellus (Broun, 1921)
- Parepierus subhumeralis Cooman, 1935
- Parepierus sylvanus (Lewis, 1879)
- Parepierus tumidifrons Cooman, 1935
