= Pseudepierus gentilis =

Scientific classification
- Kingdom: Animalia
- Phylum: Arthropoda
- Class: Insecta
- Order: Coleoptera
- Suborder: Polyphaga
- Infraorder: Staphyliniformia
- Family: Histeridae
- Genus: Pseudepierus
- Species: P. gentilis

Binomial name
- Pseudepierus gentilis (Horn, 1883)

Species of beetle

Pseudepierus gentilis is a species of clown beetle in the family Histeridae. It is found in North America.
