= Epierus cornutus =

Scientific classification
- Kingdom: Animalia
- Phylum: Arthropoda
- Class: Insecta
- Order: Coleoptera
- Suborder: Polyphaga
- Infraorder: Staphyliniformia
- Family: Histeridae
- Genus: Epierus
- Species: E. cornutus

Binomial name
- Epierus cornutus Casey, 1893

Species of beetle

Epierus cornutus is a species of clown beetle in the family Histeridae. It is found in Central America and North America.
