= Trypeticus bombacis =

Scientific classification
- Kingdom: Animalia
- Phylum: Arthropoda
- Clade: Pancrustacea
- Class: Insecta
- Order: Coleoptera
- Suborder: Polyphaga
- Infraorder: Staphyliniformia
- Family: Histeridae
- Genus: Trypeticus
- Species: T. bombacis

Binomial name
- Trypeticus bombacis (Lewis, 1885)

Synonyms
- Tryponaeus bombacis Lewis, 1885

Species of beetle

Trypeticus bombacis is a species of clown beetle found in many Oriental countries including India.

== Description ==
Length of the male without head and abdominal tergites is about 2.4 mm. Body cylindrical, shiny, and piceous black in color. Antennae and legs are rufous colored. Head with slightly elevated rostral tip. Rostrum broadly rounded anteriorly, but slightly impressed along the median line. The tip of the rostrum consists with two conical paramedian tubercles. Frons and rostrum with small punctures, and indistinct linear microsculpture, shiny interstices. Pronotum broadly rounded in front and convergent towards the anterior angles. Marginal striae distinct, and turned upwards at their posterior end. Pronotal disc rather coarse and dense punctation. Elytra slightly impressed near scutellum with convex anterior margin. There is an impunctate narrow band along the suture and smooth interspaces on elytra. Propygidium with distinct, rather dense, punctuations and indistinct linear microsculpture interstices. Pygidium triangular with broadly rounded apex. In legs, protibiae and mesotibiae possess five teeth on the outer margin.

Female is following features: Head with a transverse smooth ridge which separates vertex and frons. Face only very faintly turned upward near rostral apex. Frons and rostrum delimited at the sides by a distinct ridge. Frons and posterior part of rostrum moderately concave where there is an additional triangular median impression behind the anterior margin in rostrum. Pygidium is very faintly convex, slightly impressed along the sides, with a broadly rounded tip. The punctures near the apex with a short yellow hair. There is a transverse keel between frons and vertex.

Adults are found from Bombax and Ficus species.
