= Tribalus =

Scientific classification
- Kingdom: Animalia
- Phylum: Arthropoda
- Class: Insecta
- Order: Coleoptera
- Suborder: Polyphaga
- Infraorder: Staphyliniformia
- Family: Histeridae
- Subfamily: Tribalinae
- Genus: Tribalus; Erichson, 1834

Diversity
- About 90 species

Synonyms
- Eutribalus Bickhardt, 1921; Triballus Gemminger & Harold, 1868

Genus of beetles

Tribalus is a genus of beetles belonging to the family Histeridae. There are seven species occurring in the western Palaearctic. Apart from that, most species are distributed throughout Oriental and African regions.

== Species ==
- Tribalus acceptus Marseul, 1864
- Tribalus agrestis Marseul, 1855
- Tribalus algericus Olexa, 1980
- Tribalus amnicola Lewis, 1900
- Tribalus anatolicus Olexa, 1980
- Tribalus andrei Vienna, 1994
- Tribalus andreinii G.Müller, 1938
- Tribalus ascaphus Marseul, 1869
- Tribalus asiaticus Mazur, 1987
- Tribalus atlantis Yélamos, 1991
- Tribalus australis (MacLeay, 1871)
- Tribalus bicarinatus Lewis, 1908
- Tribalus bomba Marseul, 1871
- Tribalus brevisternus Vienna, 1993
- Tribalus brouni (Broun, 1880)
- Tribalus capensis (Paykull, 1811)
- Tribalus catenarius Lewis, 1889
- Tribalus cavernicola Lewis, 1908
- Tribalus colobius Marseul, 1864
- Tribalus colombius Marseul, 1864
- Tribalus comes Cooman, 1955
- Tribalus corylophioides Lewis, 1891
- Tribalus crypticus Vienna, 1993
- Tribalus decellei Vienna, 1994
- Tribalus distinguendus G.Müller, 1938
- Tribalus doriae Marseul, 1871
- Tribalus eggersi Bickhardt, 1921
- Tribalus elapsus Vienna, 1993
- Tribalus endroedyi Vienna, 1993
- Tribalus espanyoli Yélamos & Vienna, 1995
- Tribalus excellens Vienna, 1993
- Tribalus exilis (Paykull, 1811)
- Tribalus fastigiatus Marseul, 1881
- Tribalus floridus Vienna, 1993
- Tribalus folliardi Gomy & Aberlenc, 2006
- Tribalus foveolatus Vienna, 1993
- Tribalus freyi G.Müller, 1937
- Tribalus gioiellae Vienna, 1993
- Tribalus gracilipes Vienna, 1993
- Tribalus hornii Lewis, 1901
- Tribalus impressibasis Bickhardt, 1921
- Tribalus inopinatus Vienna, 1993
- Tribalus interruptus Vienna, 1993
- Tribalus kanaari Vienna, 1993
- Tribalus kochi Thérond, 1965
- Tribalus koenigius Marseul, 1864
- Tribalus kovariki Vienna, 1993
- Tribalus laevidorsis Lewis, 1908
- Tribalus leleupi Thérond, 1965
- Tribalus longipes Vienna, 1993
- Tribalus margiventer Mazur, 1975
- Tribalus maroccanus Olexa, 1980
- Tribalus marseuli Gomy, 1985
- Tribalus micros Mazur, 1979
- Tribalus minimus (P.Rossi, 1790)
- Tribalus minutulus Thérond, 1961
- Tribalus modicus Cooman, 1955
- Tribalus montanus Lewis, 1885
- Tribalus namibiensis Yélamos & Vienna, 1995
- Tribalus nitens Vienna, 1993
- Tribalus oblongus Vienna, 1993
- Tribalus ogieri Marseul, 1864
- Tribalus olexai Lackner, 2004
- Tribalus onustus Lewis, 1892
- Tribalus opimus Lewis, 1892
- Tribalus pakistanicus Mazur, 1987
- Tribalus phyllobius (Broun, 1914)
- Tribalus politus Vienna, 1993
- Tribalus pseudostrialis Mazur, 1975
- Tribalus pumilio Schmidt, 1895
- Tribalus puncticeps Lewis, 1908
- Tribalus punctillatus Bickhardt, 1913
- Tribalus rattii Vienna, 1993
- Tribalus rougemonti Gomy, 2004
- Tribalus rubriculus Schmidt, 1890
- Tribalus scaphidiformis (Illiger, 1807)
- Tribalus similis Vienna, 1993
- Tribalus subdolus Vienna, 1993
- Tribalus subfasciatus Vienna, 1993
- Tribalus suturalis Lewis, 1908
- Tribalus tibialis Vienna, 1993
- Tribalus tropicus Lewis, 1885
- Tribalus uhligi Yélamos & Vienna, 1995
- Tribalus unistrius Lewis, 1908
- Tribalus vitalisi Desbordes, 1920
- Tribalus yamauchii Ôhara, 1999
