= Idolia gibba =

Scientific classification
- Kingdom: Animalia
- Phylum: Arthropoda
- Class: Insecta
- Order: Coleoptera
- Suborder: Polyphaga
- Infraorder: Staphyliniformia
- Family: Histeridae
- Genus: Idolia
- Species: I. gibba

Binomial name
- Idolia gibba Lewis, 1886

Species of beetle

Idolia gibba is a species of clown beetle in the family Histeridae. It is found in Central America and South America.
