= Pseudepierus =

Scientific classification
- Kingdom: Animalia
- Phylum: Arthropoda
- Class: Insecta
- Order: Coleoptera
- Suborder: Polyphaga
- Infraorder: Staphyliniformia
- Family: Histeridae
- Subfamily: Tribalinae
- Genus: Pseudepierus; Casey, 1916

Genus of beetles

Pseudepierus is a genus of clown beetles in the family Histeridae. There are at least two described species in Pseudepierus.

== Species ==
These two species belong to the genus Pseudepierus:

- Pseudepierus gentilis (Horn, 1883)
- Pseudepierus italicus (Paykull, 1811)
