= Trypeticus =

Scientific classification
- Kingdom: Animalia
- Phylum: Arthropoda
- Clade: Pancrustacea
- Class: Insecta
- Order: Coleoptera
- Suborder: Polyphaga
- Infraorder: Staphyliniformia
- Family: Histeridae
- Subfamily: Trypeticinae
- Genus: Trypeticus; Marseul, 1864

Diversity
- 103 species

Synonyms
- Tripeticus Miwa, 1931

Genus of beetles

Trypeticus is a genus of beetles belonging to the family Histeridae.

== Taxonomy ==
In 1984, Marseul described the genus as a division of the Neotropical genus Trypanaeus described by Eschscholtz in 1829. Then he included many Indo-malayan Archipelago species based on differently shaped mesosternum. However his most works were described by stating the genus as a subgenus within Trypanaeus. Then in 1916, Bickhardt gave a solid basis for Trypeticus as separate genus and formed the separate subfamily Trypeticinae. Between 1920 and 1930, the forestry entomologist L.G.E. Kalshoven collected several species of the genus on Java and Sumatra which are currently preserved in The Nationaal Natuurhistorisch Museum at Leiden. In 1999, Slipinski and Mazur removed the subfamily Trypeticinae into the synonymy of Trypanaeinae.

== Distribution ==
The species are distributed throughout Indo-China, Malayan peninsula, the entire Indo-Malayan Archipelago including the Philippines, New Guinea, Northern Queensland, Taiwan, Southeast China, Korea, and Japan as well as Indian subcontinent, Sri Lanka and Nepal.

== Description ==
Primarily oligophagous, if not monophagous, the beetles depend on xylophagous prey species. Adults show strong sexual dimorphism. The males show great variations with a more or less thick-set body form. However, females are fairly uniform in body form, so can be detect possible patterns of distribution or patterns of diversification. Adults have a cylindrical body form, peculiar tibiae with very long tarsi. The clypeus is more or less prolonged into a rostrum. The antennal flagellum consists of six segments of more or less subconical form. In the resting position, beetle laid down through deep incisions in the anterior prosternal margin of the antennal flagelli. They also can deflect the head and retract it for the greater part into the prothorax. The posterior margin of the prosternum is transverse or at most slightly emarginate.

== Biology ==
Adult beetles live in the burrows of bark beetles and other wood-boring insects. They can be collected easily by using flight interception traps.

== Species ==
- Trypeticus adebratti Kanaar, 2003
- Trypeticus albertisii (Gestro, 1875)
- Trypeticus alticola Kanaar, 2003
- Trypeticus andaiensis (Gestro, 1875)
- Trypeticus angustifrons Kanaar, 2003
- Trypeticus arriagadai Kanaar, 2003
- Trypeticus aukei Kanaar, 2003
- Trypeticus beesoni Desbordes, 1922
- Trypeticus bertiae Kanaar, 2003
- Trypeticus bombacis (Lewis, 1885)
- Trypeticus boukei Kanaar, 2003
- Trypeticus brevis Kanaar, 2003
- Trypeticus canalifrons Bickhardt, 1913
- Trypeticus capillatus Kanaar, 2003
- Trypeticus carinifrons Kanaar, 2003
- Trypeticus carinipygus Kanaar, 2003
- Trypeticus caterinoi Kanaar, 2003
- Trypeticus cinctipygus (Marseul, 1864)
- Trypeticus clarus Kanaar, 2003
- Trypeticus convexicollis Kanaar, 2003
- Trypeticus coomani Kanaar, 2003
- Trypeticus crassus Schmidt, 1892
- Trypeticus danielssoni Kanaar, 2003
- Trypeticus degallieri Kanaar, 2003
- Trypeticus deoudei Kanaar, 2003
- Trypeticus dohertyi (Lewis, 1891)
- Trypeticus fagi (Lewis, 1884)
- Trypeticus ferrarii (Gestro, 1875)
- Trypeticus fissirostrum Zhang & Zhou, 2007
- Trypeticus foveicollis Kanaar, 2003
- Trypeticus frontalis Schmidt, 1897
- Trypeticus gestroi (Marseul, 1879)
- Trypeticus gibberosus Kanaar, 2003
- Trypeticus gilolous (Marseul, 1864)
- Trypeticus gomyi Kanaar, 2003
- Trypeticus gracilis Kanaar, 2003
- Trypeticus gratus Kanaar, 2003
- Trypeticus grouvellei Marseul, 1883
- Trypeticus hamatipygus Kanaar, 2003
- Trypeticus helleri Bickhardt, 1918
- Trypeticus hielkemaorum Kanaar, 2003
- Trypeticus hinei Kanaar, 2003
- Trypeticus houseae Kanaar, 2003
- Trypeticus huijbregtsi Kanaar, 2003
- Trypeticus immanis Kanaar, 2003
- Trypeticus incilis Lewis, 1897
- Trypeticus indicus Lewis, 1893
- Trypeticus jaegeri Kanaar, 2003
- Trypeticus jelmeri Kanaar, 2003
- Trypeticus jorisi Kanaar, 2003
- Trypeticus kalemantanus (Marseul, 1864)
- Trypeticus kalshoveni Kanaar, 2003
- Trypeticus kapleri Kanaar, 2003
- Trypeticus kirtoni Kanaar, 2003
- Trypeticus lackneri Kanaar, 2003
- Trypeticus latilabris Kanaar, 2003
- Trypeticus latirostrum Kanaar, 2003
- Trypeticus latisternum Kanaar, 2003
- Trypeticus loebli Kanaar, 2003
- Trypeticus longicollis Heller, 1915
- Trypeticus mazuri Kanaar, 2003
- Trypeticus merkli Kanaar, 2003
- Trypeticus minutissimus Kanaar, 2003
- Trypeticus minutulus Lewis, 1891
- Trypeticus mirandus Kanaar, 2003
- Trypeticus monteithi Kanaar, 2003
- Trypeticus nasicus Kanaar, 2003
- Trypeticus nemorivagus Lewis, 1892
- Trypeticus nepalensis Kanaar, 2003
- Trypeticus nitens Kanaar, 2003
- Trypeticus obeliscus Lewis, 1891
- Trypeticus parilloi Kanaar, 2003
- Trypeticus parobeliscus Kanaar, 2003
- Trypeticus pederseni Kanaar, 2003
- Trypeticus penatii Kanaar, 2003
- Trypeticus penicillicauda Kanaar, 2003
- Trypeticus planisternus Lewis, 1897
- Trypeticus poggii Kanaar, 2003
- Trypeticus pooti Kanaar, 2003
- Trypeticus protractus Kanaar, 2003
- Trypeticus rectangulus Kanaar, 2003
- Trypeticus riedeli Kanaar, 2003
- Trypeticus rombauti Kanaar, 2003
- Trypeticus rostricauda Kanaar, 2003
- Trypeticus rostripygus Bickhardt, 1912
- Trypeticus sanneae Kanaar, 2003
- Trypeticus sauteri Bickhardt, 1913
- Trypeticus schawalleri Kanaar, 2003
- Trypeticus silvicola Schmidt, 1897
- Trypeticus smetanai Kanaar, 2003
- Trypeticus subobeliscus Kanaar, 2003
- Trypeticus sulcisternum Kanaar, 2003
- Trypeticus tabacigliscens Marseul, 1883
- Trypeticus therondi Kanaar, 2003
- Trypeticus trigonifrons Kanaar, 2003
- Trypeticus tuberculinotum Kanaar, 2003
- Trypeticus uhligi Kanaar, 2003
- Trypeticus valens Kanaar, 2003
- Trypeticus vanasseni Kanaar, 2003
- Trypeticus veda (Lewis, 1885)
- Trypeticus venator (Lewis, 1884)
- Trypeticus viennai Kanaar, 2003
- Trypeticus yunnanensis Zhang & Zhou, 2007
