= Epierus regularis =

Scientific classification
- Kingdom: Animalia
- Phylum: Arthropoda
- Class: Insecta
- Order: Coleoptera
- Suborder: Polyphaga
- Infraorder: Staphyliniformia
- Family: Histeridae
- Genus: Epierus
- Species: E. regularis

Binomial name
- Epierus regularis (Palisot de Beauvois, 1818)

Species of beetle

Epierus regularis is a species of clown beetle in the family Histeridae. It is found in North America.
