= Epierus mehicanus =

Scientific classification
- Kingdom: Animalia
- Phylum: Arthropoda
- Clade: Pancrustacea
- Class: Insecta
- Order: Coleoptera
- Suborder: Polyphaga
- Infraorder: Staphyliniformia
- Family: Histeridae
- Genus: Epierus
- Species: E. mehicanus

Binomial name
- Epierus mehicanus J. E. LeConte, 1860

Species of beetle

Epierus mehicanus is a species of clown beetle in the family Histeridae. It is found in Central America.
