= Tribalus colombius =

Scientific classification
- Kingdom: Animalia
- Phylum: Arthropoda
- Class: Insecta
- Order: Coleoptera
- Suborder: Polyphaga
- Infraorder: Staphyliniformia
- Family: Histeridae
- Genus: Tribalus
- Species: T. colombius

Binomial name
- Tribalus colombius Marseul, 1864

Species of beetle

Tribalus (Eutribalus) colombius, is a species of clown beetle found in many Oriental countries including India, Sri Lanka, Myanmar, Taiwan, Vietnam, Philippines, and Australia.
