= Idolia =

Scientific classification
- Kingdom: Animalia
- Phylum: Arthropoda
- Class: Insecta
- Order: Coleoptera
- Suborder: Polyphaga
- Infraorder: Staphyliniformia
- Family: Histeridae
- Subfamily: Tribalinae
- Genus: Idolia; Lewis, 1885

Genus of beetles

Idolia is a genus of clown beetles in the family Histeridae. There are about six described species in Idolia.

== Species ==
These six species belong to the genus Idolia:

- Idolia antennata Lewis, 1888
- Idolia gibba Lewis, 1886
- Idolia laevigata Lewis, 1885
- Idolia laevissima (J. L. LeConte, 1852)
- Idolia punctisternum Lewis, 1885
- Idolia scitula Lewis, 1888
