= Epierus decipiens =

Scientific classification
- Kingdom: Animalia
- Phylum: Arthropoda
- Clade: Pancrustacea
- Class: Insecta
- Order: Coleoptera
- Suborder: Polyphaga
- Infraorder: Staphyliniformia
- Family: Histeridae
- Genus: Epierus
- Species: E. decipiens

Binomial name
- Epierus decipiens J. L. LeConte, 1851

Species of beetle

Epierus decipiens is a species of clown beetle in the family Histeridae. It is found in North America.
