= Aderpas griseus =

Scientific classification
- Domain: Eukaryota
- Kingdom: Animalia
- Phylum: Arthropoda
- Class: Insecta
- Order: Coleoptera
- Suborder: Polyphaga
- Infraorder: Cucujiformia
- Family: Cerambycidae
- Genus: Aderpas
- Species: A. griseus

Binomial name
- Aderpas griseus (Thomson, 1858)

Species of beetle

Aderpas griseus is a species of beetle in the family Cerambycidae. It was described by James Thomson in 1858.
