= Aderpas nyassicus =

Scientific classification
- Domain: Eukaryota
- Kingdom: Animalia
- Phylum: Arthropoda
- Class: Insecta
- Order: Coleoptera
- Suborder: Polyphaga
- Infraorder: Cucujiformia
- Family: Cerambycidae
- Genus: Aderpas
- Species: A. nyassicus

Binomial name
- Aderpas nyassicus Breuning, 1935

Species of beetle

Aderpas nyassicus is a species of beetle in the family Cerambycidae. It was described by Stephan von Breuning in 1935.
