= Parepierus brunneus =

Scientific classification
- Kingdom: Animalia
- Phylum: Arthropoda
- Class: Insecta
- Order: Coleoptera
- Suborder: Polyphaga
- Infraorder: Staphyliniformia
- Family: Histeridae
- Genus: Parepierus
- Species: P. brunneus

Binomial name
- Parepierus brunneus (Broun, 1881)

Synonyms
- Abraeus brunneus Broun, 1881

Species of beetle

Parepierus brunneus is a beetle first described as Abraeus brunneus by Thomas Broun in 1881. In 2017, it was reassigned to Parepierus by R. A. B. Leschen and M. Ôhara.
