= Trypeticinae =

Scientific classification
- Kingdom: Animalia
- Phylum: Arthropoda
- Class: Insecta
- Order: Coleoptera
- Suborder: Polyphaga
- Infraorder: Staphyliniformia
- Family: Histeridae
- Subfamily: Trypeticinae; Bickhardt, 1913

Subfamily of beetles

Trypeticinae is a subfamily of clown beetles in the family Histeridae. There are at least 3 genera and more than 110 described species in Trypeticinae.

== Genera ==
These three genera belong to the subfamily Trypeticinae:

- Pygocoelis Lewis, 1897
- Trypeticus Marseul, 1864
- Trypobius Schmidt, 1893
