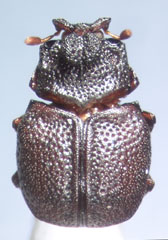
- Ceratohister ankylonotum

Scientific classification
- Kingdom: Animalia
- Phylum: Arthropoda
- Class: Insecta
- Order: Coleoptera
- Suborder: Polyphaga
- Infraorder: Staphyliniformia
- Family: Histeridae
- Subfamily: Chlamydopsinae; Bickhardt, 1914

= Chlamydopsinae =

Subfamily of beetles

Chlamydopsinae is a subfamily of clown beetles in the family Histeridae. There are about 13 genera and more than 170 described species in Chlamydopsinae.

== Genera ==
These 13 genera belong to the subfamily Chlamydopsinae:

- Ceratohister Reichensperger, 1924
- Chlamydonia Caterino, 2006
- Chlamydopsis Westwood, 1869
- Ectatommiphila Lea, 1914
- Eucurtia Mjöberg, 1912
- Eucurtiopsis Silvestri, 1926
- Gomyopsis Dégallier, 1984
- Kanakopsis Caterino, 2006
- Orectoscelis Lewis, 1903
- Papuopsis Caterino & Dégallier, 2007
- Pheidoliphila Lea, 1914
- Quasimodopsis Caterino & Dégallier, 2007
- Teretriopsis Caterino & Dégallier, 2007
