= Aderpas obliquefasciatus =

Scientific classification
- Domain: Eukaryota
- Kingdom: Animalia
- Phylum: Arthropoda
- Class: Insecta
- Order: Coleoptera
- Suborder: Polyphaga
- Infraorder: Cucujiformia
- Family: Cerambycidae
- Genus: Aderpas
- Species: A. obliquefasciatus

Binomial name
- Aderpas obliquefasciatus Breuning, 1974

Species of beetle

Aderpas obliquefasciatus is a species of beetle in the family Cerambycidae. It was described by Stephan von Breuning in 1974.
