= Trypanaeinae =

Scientific classification
- Kingdom: Animalia
- Phylum: Arthropoda
- Class: Insecta
- Order: Coleoptera
- Suborder: Polyphaga
- Infraorder: Staphyliniformia
- Family: Histeridae
- Subfamily: Trypanaeinae; Marseul, 1857

Subfamily of beetles

Trypanaeinae is a subfamily of clown beetles in the family Histeridae. There are at least 3 genera and more than 70 described species in Trypanaeinae.

== Genera ==
These three genera belong to the subfamily Trypanaeinae:

- Coptotrophis Lewis, 1902
- Trypanaeus Eschscholtz, 1829
- Xylonaeus Lewis, 1902
