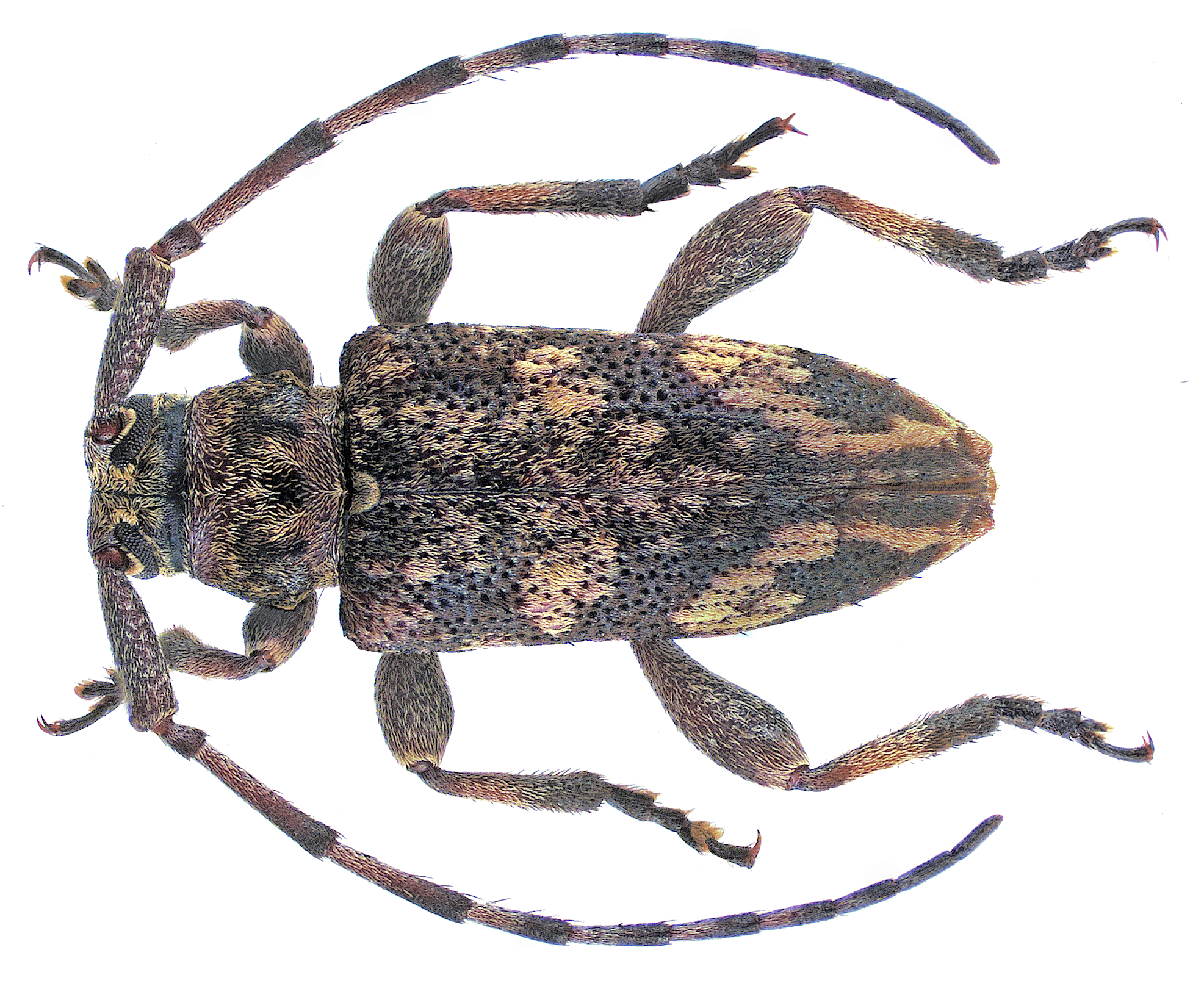

Scientific classification
- Domain: Eukaryota
- Kingdom: Animalia
- Phylum: Arthropoda
- Class: Insecta
- Order: Coleoptera
- Suborder: Polyphaga
- Infraorder: Cucujiformia
- Family: Cerambycidae
- Genus: Aderpas
- Species: A. pauper

Binomial name
- Aderpas pauper (Fahraeus, 1872)

= Aderpas pauper =

Species of beetle

Aderpas pauper is a species of beetle in the family Cerambycidae. It was described by Fahraeus in 1872.
