= Agniohammus philippinensis =

Scientific classification
- Kingdom: Animalia
- Phylum: Arthropoda
- Class: Insecta
- Order: Coleoptera
- Suborder: Polyphaga
- Infraorder: Cucujiformia
- Family: Cerambycidae
- Genus: Agniohammus
- Species: A. philippinensis

Binomial name
- Agniohammus philippinensis Breuning, 1938

Species of beetle

Agniohammus philippinensis is a species of beetle in the family Cerambycidae. It was described by Stephan von Breuning in 1938. It is known from the Philippines.
