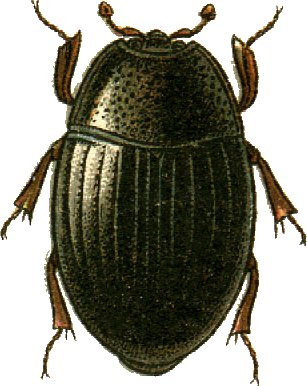
- Epierus comptus

Scientific classification
- Kingdom: Animalia
- Phylum: Arthropoda
- Class: Insecta
- Order: Coleoptera
- Suborder: Polyphaga
- Infraorder: Staphyliniformia
- Family: Histeridae
- Subfamily: Tribalinae
- Genus: Epierus; Erichson, 1834

= Epierus =

Genus of beetles

Epierus is a genus of clown beetles in the family Histeridae. There are more than 50 described species in Epierus.

== Species ==
These 54 species belong to the genus Epierus:

- Epierus alberti Marseul, 1861
- Epierus alutaceus Marseul, 1854
- Epierus angularis Schmidt, 1896
- Epierus antillarum Marseul, 1854
- Epierus beccarii Marseul, 1871
- Epierus binasutus Cooman, 1935
- Epierus bisbistriatus Marseul, 1854
- Epierus biscissus Marseul, 1880
- Epierus brunnipennis Marseul, 1854
- Epierus comptus Erichson, 1834
- Epierus cornutus Casey, 1893
- Epierus cubensis Casey
- Epierus cylindricus Wenzel, 1944
- Epierus dalaunayi Lewis, 1890
- Epierus decipiens J. L. LeConte, 1851
- Epierus duplicatus Casey
- Epierus floridanus Casey
- Epierus foveolatus Hinton, 1935
- Epierus fulvicornis (Fabricius, 1801)
- Epierus humeristrius Schmidt, 1889
- Epierus incultus Marseul, 1854
- Epierus inscriptus Schmidt, 1896
- Epierus insularis Schmidt, 1889
- Epierus invidus Marseul, 1861
- Epierus kraatzi Schmidt, 1889
- Epierus laevistrius Marseul, 1854
- Epierus latior Bickhardt, 1920
- Epierus longulus Marseul, 1854
- Epierus lucidulus Erichson, 1834
- Epierus lucus Lewis, 1884
- Epierus mariae Marseul, 1861
- Epierus mehicanus J. E. LeConte, 1860
- Epierus nasicornis Bickhardt, 1914
- Epierus nasutus Horn, 1873
- Epierus nemoralis Lewis, 1892
- Epierus notius Marseul, 1861
- Epierus obesulus Casey
- Epierus oblongus Casey
- Epierus obsolescens Casey
- Epierus ovalis Casey
- Epierus planulus Erichson, 1834
- Epierus pulicarius Erichson, 1834
- Epierus regularis (Palisot de Beauvois, 1818)
- Epierus sauteri Bickhardt, 1913
- Epierus scitus Lewis, 1888
- Epierus smaragdinus Marseul, 1862
- Epierus subtropicus Casey
- Epierus toxopei Desbordes, 1926
- Epierus uenoi Ôhara, 1994
- Epierus vandepolli Schmidt, 1889
- Epierus vethi (Bickhardt, 1912)
- Epierus vicinus J. L. LeConte, 1851
- Epierus villiersi Cooman, 1938
- Epierus waterhousii Marseul, 1854
