= Acanthiophilus minor =

Scientific classification
- Kingdom: Animalia
- Phylum: Arthropoda
- Class: Insecta
- Order: Diptera
- Family: Tephritidae
- Subfamily: Tephritinae
- Tribe: Tephritini
- Genus: Acanthiophilus
- Species: A. minor

Binomial name
- Acanthiophilus minor Morgulis & Freidburg, 2015

Species of fly

Acanthiophilus minor is a species of tephritid or fruit flies in the genus Acanthiophilus of the family Tephritidae.
