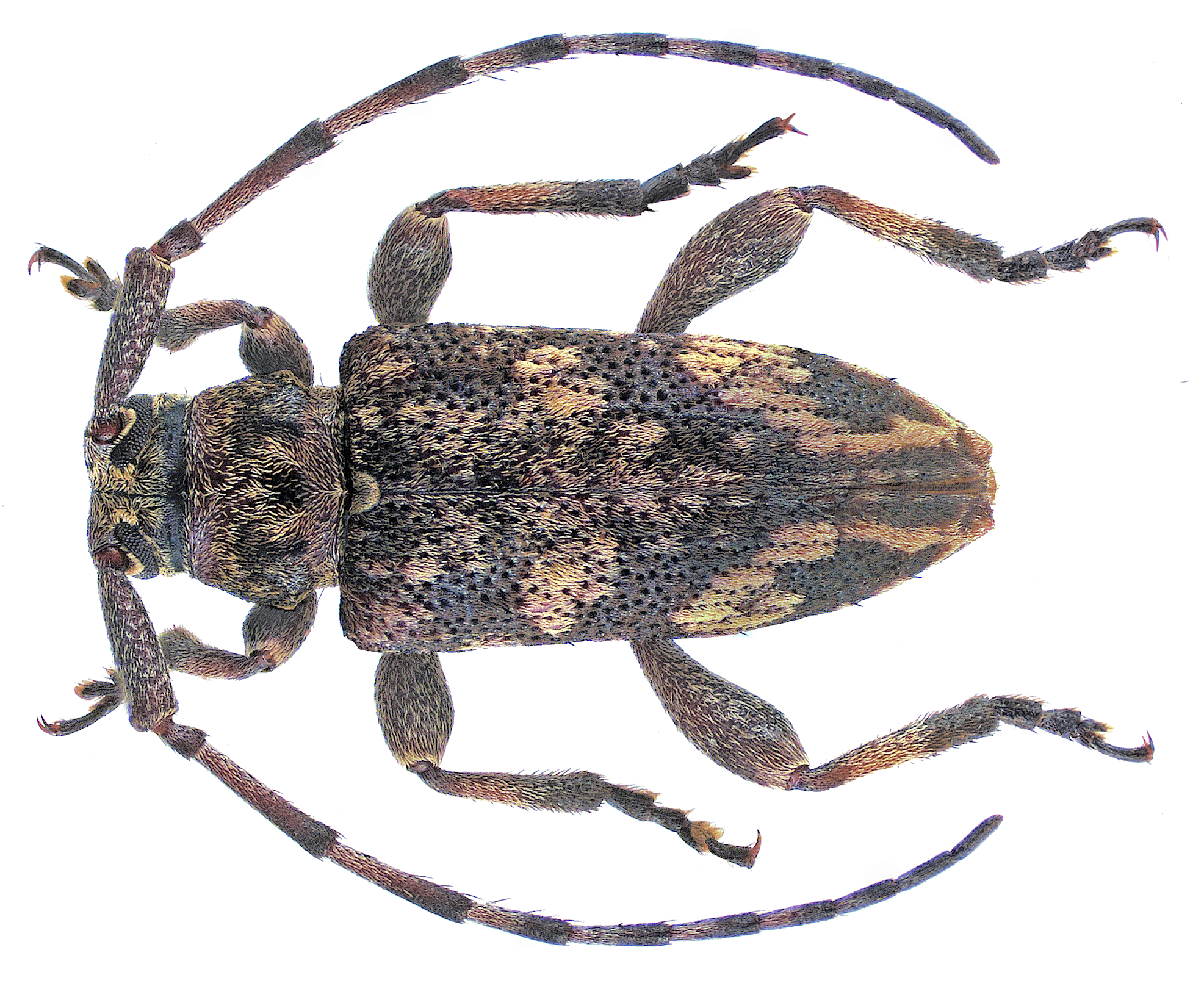
- A. pauper from Tsavo West, Kenya

Scientific classification
- Kingdom: Animalia
- Phylum: Arthropoda
- Class: Insecta
- Order: Coleoptera
- Suborder: Polyphaga
- Infraorder: Cucujiformia
- Family: Cerambycidae
- Tribe: Aderpasini; Breuning & Téocchi, 1977
- Genus: Aderpas; Thomson, 1864

= Aderpas =

Tribe of beetles

Aderpas is a tribe of longhorn beetles of the subfamily Lamiinae. It was described by Stephan von Breuning and Téocchi in 1977. It is the only genus in the tribe, Aderpasini, and contains the following species:

- Aderpas brunneus (Thomson, 1858)
- Aderpas congolensis Hintz, 1913
- Aderpas griseotinctus Hunt & Breuning, 1955
- Aderpas griseus (Thomson, 1858)
- Aderpas lineolatus (Chevrolat, 1858)
- Aderpas nyassicus Breuning, 1935
- Aderpas obliquefasciatus Breuning, 1974
- Aderpas pauper (Fahraeus, 1872)
- Aderpas punctulatus Jordan, 1894
- Aderpas subfasciatus Jordan, 1894
