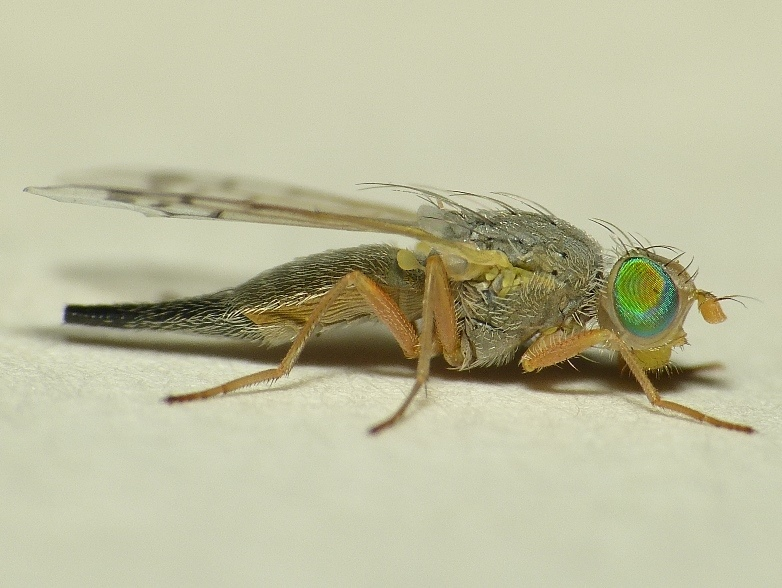
- Acanthiophilus helianthi Netherlands

Scientific classification
- Kingdom: Animalia
- Phylum: Arthropoda
- Class: Insecta
- Order: Diptera
- Family: Tephritidae
- Subfamily: Tephritinae
- Tribe: Tephritini
- Genus: Acanthiophilus; Becker, 1908

Type species
- Tetanocera walkeri Wollaston, 1858

= Acanthiophilus =

Genus of flies

Acanthiophilus is a genus of tephritid or fruit flies in the family Tephritidae.

== Species ==
- A. brunneus Munro, 1934
- A. ciconia Munro, 1957
- A. helianthi (Rossi, 1794)
- A. lugubris Hering, 1939
- A. minor Morgulis & Freidburg, 2015
- A. summissus Morgulis & Freidburg, 2015
- A. unicus Morgulis & Freidburg, 2015
- A. walkeri (Wollaston, 1858)

The following have been reassigned to other genera:

- A. astrophorus Hering, 1939
- A. coarctatus Hering, 1942
- A. koehleri Hering, 1940
- A. melanoxanthus Hering, 1938
- A. trypaneodes Hering, 1937

== Global distribution ==
Acanthiophilus is a predominantly Afrotropical genus. One species, A. helianthi is found in Europe, to Mongolia, North Africa, Afghanistan & Thailand. as well as at the Canary islands, in India and Sri-Lanka.
