= Agniohammus =

Scientific classification
- Domain: Eukaryota
- Kingdom: Animalia
- Phylum: Arthropoda
- Class: Insecta
- Order: Coleoptera
- Suborder: Polyphaga
- Infraorder: Cucujiformia
- Family: Cerambycidae
- Tribe: Lamiini
- Genus: Agniohammus

Genus of beetles

Agniohammus is a genus of longhorn beetles of the subfamily Lamiinae, containing the following species:

- Agniohammus brunneus (Breuning, 1967)
- Agniohammus olivaceus Breuning, 1936
- Agniohammus philippinensis Breuning, 1938
