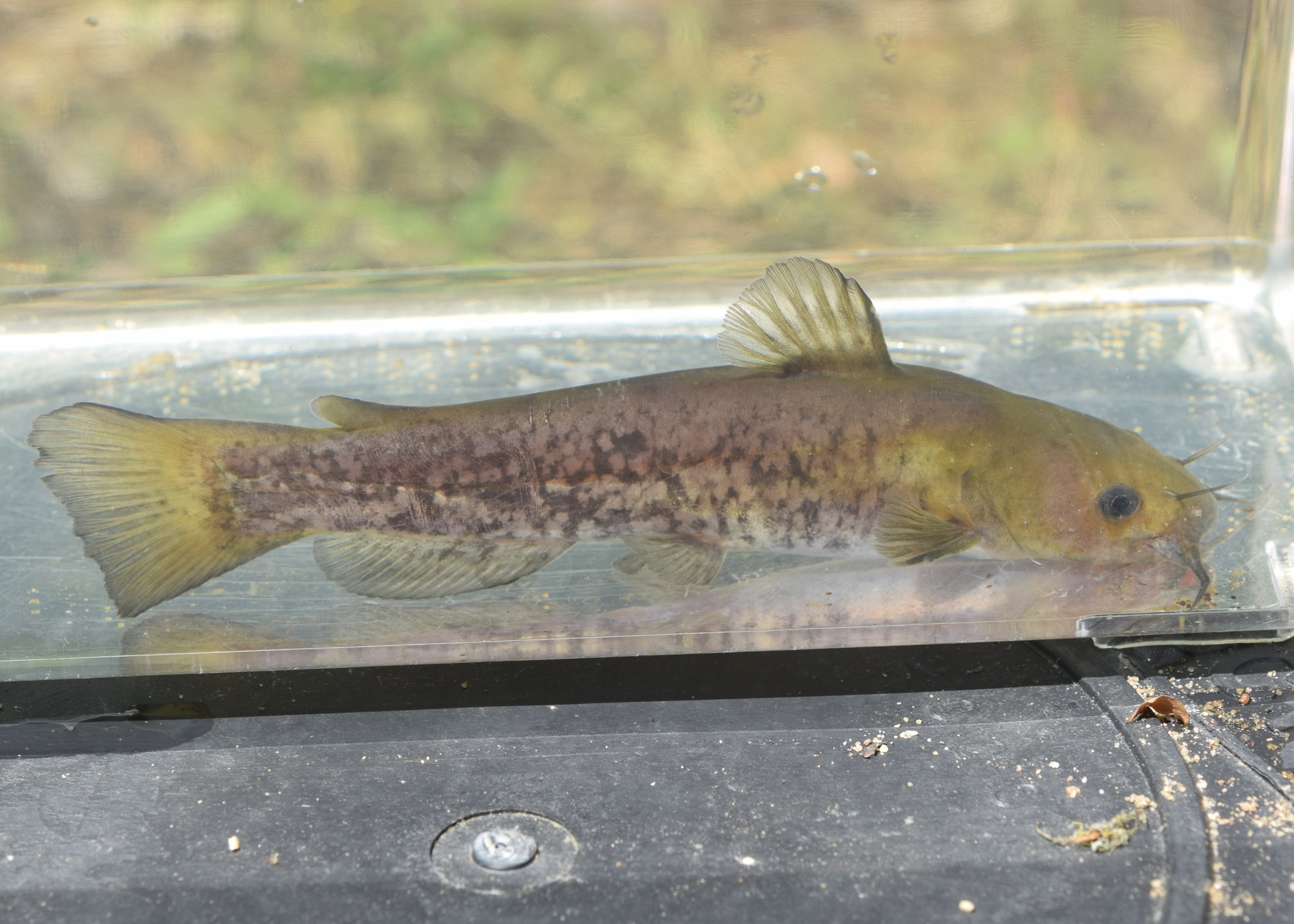

Conservation status
- Least Concern (IUCN 3.1)

Scientific classification
- Kingdom: Animalia
- Phylum: Chordata
- Class: Actinopterygii
- Order: Siluriformes
- Family: Ictaluridae
- Genus: Ameiurus
- Species: A. brunneus

Binomial name
- Ameiurus brunneus Jordan, 1877

Synonyms
- Amiurus brunneus Jordan, 1877 Ictalurus brunneus (Jordan, 1877)

= Snail bullhead =

Species of fish

The snail bullhead (Ameiurus brunneus) is a bony fish in the family Ictaluridae distributed widely in the southeastern United States. Among its bullhead catfish congeners, it has many North American relatives, like the brown bullhead (Ameiurus nebulosus) and black bullhead (Ameirurus melas). The species was described in 1877 by David Starr Jordan in the Ocmulgee River in Georgia.

Little is known about this species of fish and it is not a particularly prized fish due to its small size. The only known alias is the general vernacular term for all catfish in the United States, "mudcat".

== Description ==
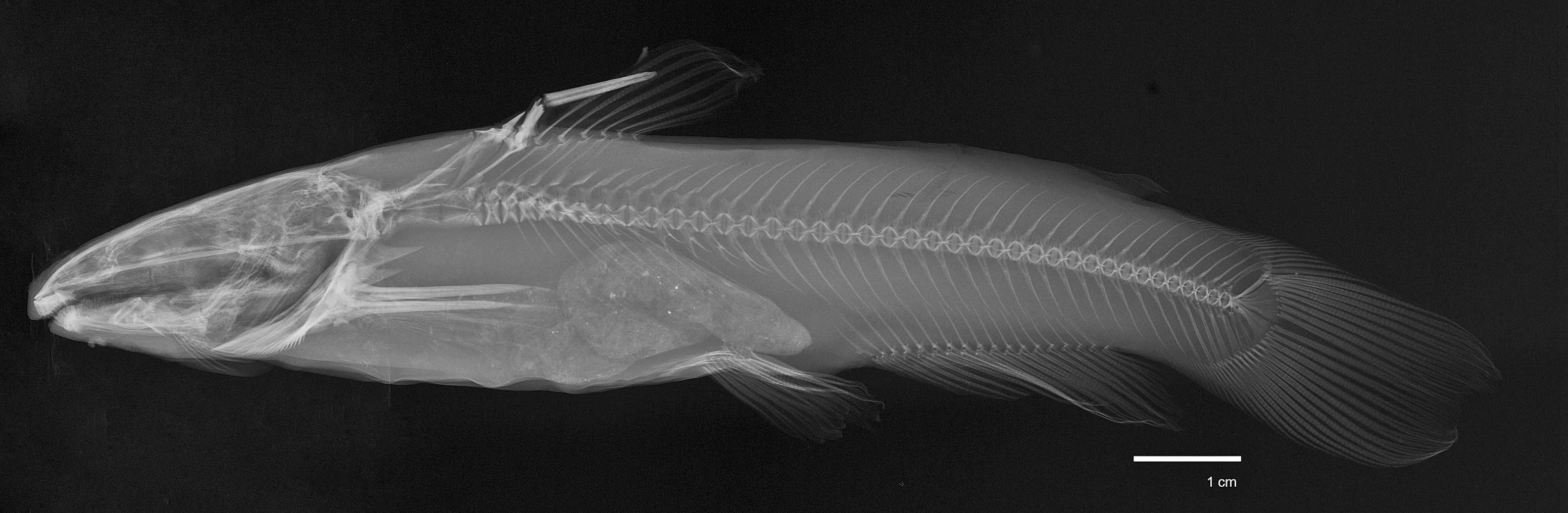
Lateral radiograph

The snail bullhead grows to an adult size of approximately 11.4 inches (29 cm) in fluvial habitat and up to 17.6 inches (45 cm) in disturbed habitats, such as reservoirs and impounded rivers. The fish has a has a flat head, typical of North American ictalurids, eight mouth barbels, a rounded anal fin, an emarginate tail, two pectoral fins, an adipose fin and a body lacking scales. The anal fin of A. brunneus typically has 17 to 20 fin rays, fewer than that of a related species, the flat bullhead (A. platycephalus), although some individuals may have as many as 22 rays. They also have three spines, one on the dorsal and two on the pectoral fins, which are coated with a toxic irritant that inflicts local pain and swelling as a defense against predation. The pectoral spines have fine serrations, but lack coarse teeth, which helps to distinguish snail bullheads from spotted bullheads (A. serracanthus). A. brunneus can vary greatly in color but the most commonly observed morphs have brown to yellow-green backs with mottled sides and a white belly. There is a dark spot or bar that colors the base of the dorsal fin. It should also be noted that these fish are ectothermic, bilaterally symmetrical and nocturnal.

== Distribution ==
The snail bullhead has a native range in the Southeast. They primarily occur from Virginia to Florida through Alabama. The uppermost portion of their range is along the Dan River in Virginia along the Atlantic slope, down to the Altamaha River system in Georgia and ends at the St. John's River drainage in Florida. They also occur in the Gulf drainage such as Apalachicola River Drainage. Their range in Georgia includes Tennessee, Coosa, Chattahoochee, Flint, Satilla, Ocmulgee, Oconee, Altamaha, Ogeechee, and Savannah River basins.

The fish is relatively common in its home range. In South Carolina, they are most abundant in smaller streams in the upper Santee drainage but are more rare in coastal streams. The largest abundance is in the Broad River Basin due to absence of introduced species.

== Habitat ==
The snail bullhead is a generalist with its habitat. It has been found in shallow, slow water and, preferred, deep, fast water. They are found in riffles, runs and pools and streams, rivers and lakes. As a nocturnal species, they prefer cover under rock and wood structures during the day and forage in the open at riffles at night. They prefer fast flowing water in high gradient streams due to the purity and clarity of the water but will also live in stagnant water.

== Diet ==
Little is known about to diet of snail bullheads with only a few studies ever being conducted. They are known omnivorous benthic bottom feeders that use their barbels for taste, touch and reading electric currents due to their poor sight. They are predators of invertebrates, like snails, crayfish and caddisflies, as well as other fish, mainly cyprinids. Additionally, they are believed to forage on filamentous algae and other plants, although these may be sourced indirectly from the ingestion of caddisfly larval cases. It has also been observed that the diet of snail bullheads has similar composition across the lifespan.

== Conservation ==
The snail bullhead may currently be a species of "least concern", but that doesn't mean it is safe. Their home range is decreasing due to a myriad of factors. The primary concern for the snail bullhead is the introduction of invasive species, in particular the flathead catfish (Pylodictis olivaris). The flathead has been known to prey upon the snail bullhead and greatly reduce populations in rivers. Flathead catfish also have a displacing effect on the snail bullhead by running them out of large rivers and confining them to smaller streams. Flathead catfish are common because people intentionally stock them into rivers and streams as a sportfish, with unforeseen effects on native fauna. Along with invasive predators, snail bullheads are threatened by sedimentation, hydrologic modification, impoundments, non-point source pollution and development.

An analysis of the population of snail bullheads and other ictalurids in the Cape Fear River basin, published in 2021, supported previous recommendations that the harvest of snail bullheads, along with their native bullhead relatives, be restricted in North Carolina.

== See also ==
- Bullhead catfish
- Flathead catfish
- Brown bullhead
