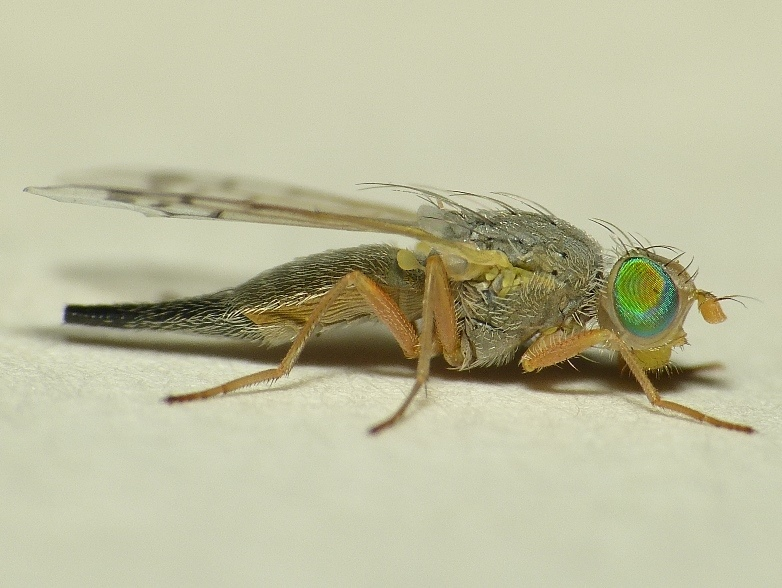
- Acanthiophilus helianthi Netherlands

Scientific classification
- Kingdom: Animalia
- Phylum: Arthropoda
- Class: Insecta
- Order: Diptera
- Family: Tephritidae
- Subfamily: Tephritinae
- Tribe: Tephritini
- Genus: Acanthiophilus
- Species: A. helianthi

Binomial name
- Acanthiophilus helianthi (Rossi, 1794)

Synonyms
- Musca helianthi Rossi, 1794; Acanthiophilus helianthe Bezzi, 1918; Trypeta eluta Meigen, 1826

= Acanthiophilus helianthi =

Species of fly

Acanthiophilus helianthi is a species of fruit fly in the family Tephritidae.

== Description ==
Europe, to Mongolia, North Africa, Afghanistan & Thailand.
