= Aderpas congolensis =

Scientific classification
- Domain: Eukaryota
- Kingdom: Animalia
- Phylum: Arthropoda
- Class: Insecta
- Order: Coleoptera
- Suborder: Polyphaga
- Infraorder: Cucujiformia
- Family: Cerambycidae
- Genus: Aderpas
- Species: A. congolensis

Binomial name
- Aderpas congolensis Hintz, 1913

Species of beetle

Aderpas congolensis is a species of beetle in the family Cerambycidae. It was described by Hintz in 1913.
