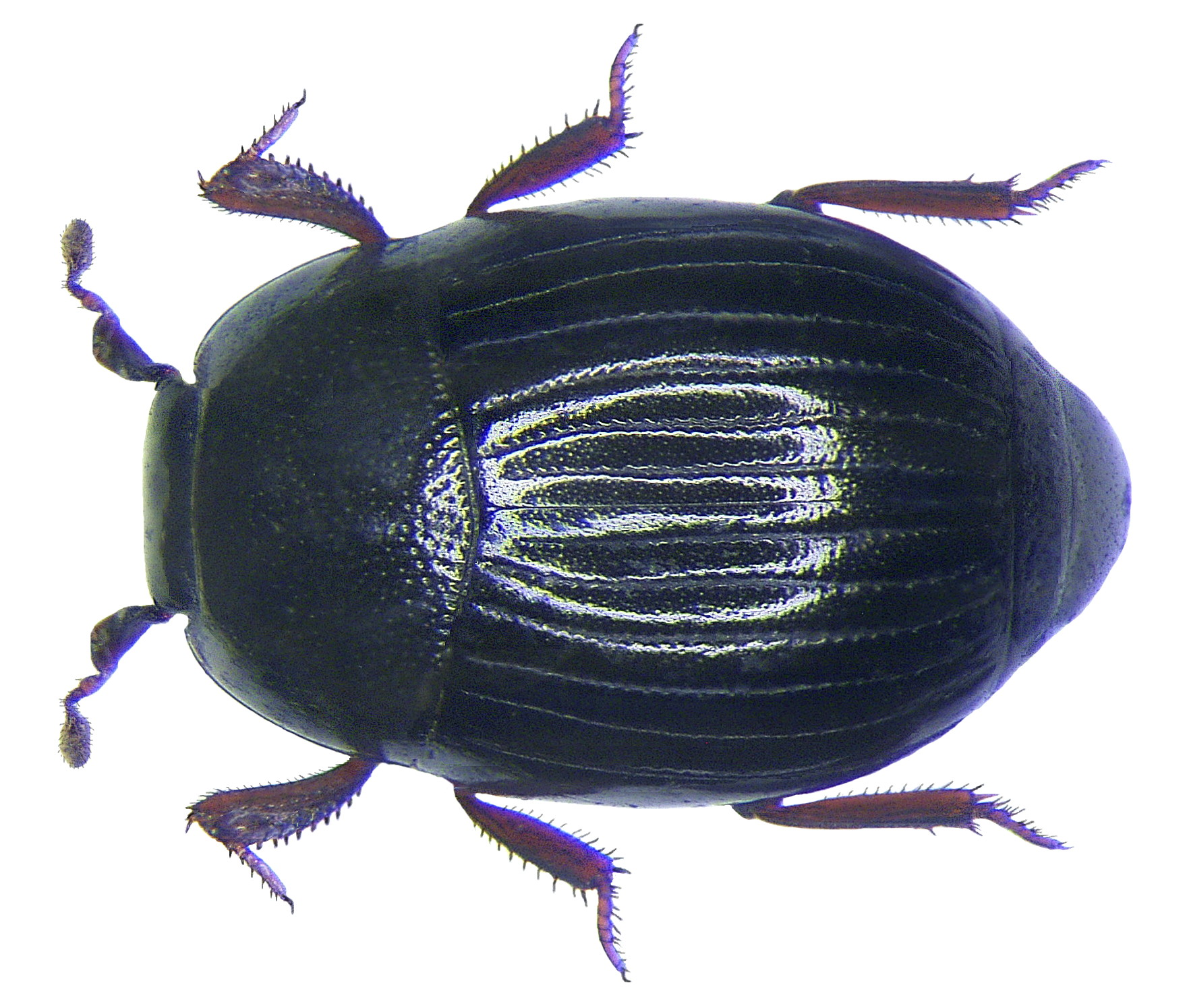
- Epierus comptus

Scientific classification
- Kingdom: Animalia
- Phylum: Arthropoda
- Class: Insecta
- Order: Coleoptera
- Suborder: Polyphaga
- Infraorder: Staphyliniformia
- Family: Histeridae
- Subfamily: Tribalinae; Bickhardt, 1914

= Tribalinae =

Subfamily of beetles

Tribalinae is a subfamily of clown beetles in the family Histeridae. There are about 11 genera and more than 220 described species in Tribalinae.

== Genera ==
These 11 genera belong to the subfamily Tribalinae:

- Caerosternus J. L. LeConte, 1852
- Epierus Erichson, 1834
- Idolia Lewis, 1885
- Parepierus Bickhardt, 1913
- Plagiogramma Tarsia in Curia, 1935
- Pseudepierus Casey, 1916
- Scaphidister Cooman, 1933
- Sphaericosoma Marseul, 1868
- Stictostix Marseul, 1870
- Tribalasia Cooman, 1941
- Tribalus Erichson, 1834
