= Spotted bullhead =

Conservation status
- Least Concern (IUCN 3.1)

Scientific classification
- Kingdom: Animalia
- Phylum: Chordata
- Class: Actinopterygii
- Order: Siluriformes
- Family: Ictaluridae
- Genus: Ameiurus
- Species: A. serracanthus

Binomial name
- Ameiurus serracanthus (Yerger & Relyea, 1968)

Synonyms
- Ictalurus serracanthus Yerger & Relyea, 1968

Species of fish

The spotted bullhead (Ameiurus serracanthus) is a species of bullhead catfish endemic to the Southeastern United States.

== Description ==
The spotted bullhead is the smallest of the bullhead catfish, with its maximum length being only 9 inches (23 cm). The spotted bullhead is one of the more striking members of the bullhead family, with its yellow or cream colored spots being its most distinguishing feature. It is a member of a group of bullhead species having a black blotch at the base of the dorsal fin and a relatively large eye. The spotted catfish has a strongly serrated pectoral spine which has 6 to 20 large serrae. All the fins are edged in black, and the caudal fin is moderately emarginate.

== Distribution ==
The spotted bullhead has confirmed records spanning Florida's northwest, northern, central and eastern Alabama, and northern and western Georgia.

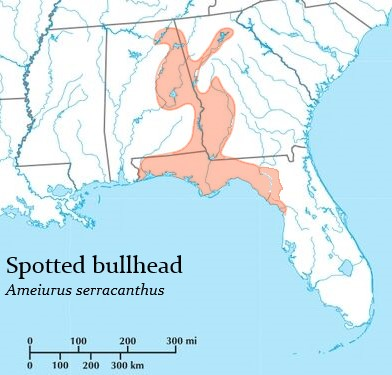
Estimated range based on the map by BISON 2017

== Habitat ==
The spotted bullhead is a freshwater demersal fish, known to inhabit mainstem and large tributaries. It inhabits rocky or sandy substrates with moderate currents and is particularly fond of deep holes in the river systems. The spotted bullhead has been occasionally spotted over mud near vegetation, stumps and impounded portions of rivers.

== Diet ==
While no detailed studies of the diet of the spotted bullhead have been made, residents of northern Florida often refer to the spotted bullhead as "snailcat," (not to be confused with the snail bullhead) due to it being known to consume mollusks. Four different species of mollusks identified from stomach contents.

== Mortality ==
Aside from human consumption and sport fishing the spotted bullhead may fall victim to predators such as otters and snapping turtles but it is particularly threatened by the presence of larger catfish. Bullhead catfishes are extremely vulnerable to predation by introduced species of large catfishes, such as flathead catfish and the blue catfish. Both of these species have been introduced into the Flint and Chattahoochee River systems. Population fragmentation is also a threat, particularly in heavily impounded Chattahoochee River.

== Angling and human use ==
The spotted bullhead is not sought after commercially due to its small size, though it has been known to occasionally appear in markets for human consumption. No Office International des Epizooties (OIE)–reportable diseases have been documented for this species.
