= Aderpas griseotinctus =

Scientific classification
- Kingdom: Animalia
- Phylum: Arthropoda
- Class: Insecta
- Order: Coleoptera
- Suborder: Polyphaga
- Infraorder: Cucujiformia
- Family: Cerambycidae
- Genus: Aderpas
- Species: A. griseotinctus

Binomial name
- Aderpas griseotinctus Hunt & Breuning, 1955

Species of beetle

Aderpas griseotinctus is a species of beetle in the family Cerambycidae. It was described by Hunt and Breuning in 1955.
