= Niponius =

Scientific classification
- Kingdom: Animalia
- Phylum: Arthropoda
- Class: Insecta
- Order: Coleoptera
- Suborder: Polyphaga
- Infraorder: Staphyliniformia
- Family: Histeridae
- Subfamily: Niponiinae; Fowler, 1912
- Genus: Niponius; Lewis, 1885

Genus of beetles

Niponius is a genus of clown beetles in the family Histeridae, the sole genus in the subfamily Niponiinae. There are more than 20 described species in Niponius.

== Species ==
These 24 species belong to the genus Niponius:

- Niponius andrewesi Lewis, 1893
- Niponius bicolor Gardner, 1935
- Niponius canalicollis Lewis, 1901
- Niponius foveicollis Lewis, 1913
- Niponius furcatus Lewis, 1885
- Niponius himalayensis Gardner, 1926
- Niponius impressicollis Lewis, 1885
- Niponius interstitialis Lewis, 1913
- Niponius magnus Sengupta & Pal, 1995
- Niponius obtusiceps Lewis, 1885
- Niponius osorioceps Lewis, 1885
- Niponius parvulus Lewis, 1893
- Niponius piceae Reichardt, 1933
- Niponius polinae Reichardt, 1936
- Niponius punjabensis Gardner, 1926
- Niponius simplicipygus Reichardt, 1938
- Niponius striaticeps Lewis, 1904
- Niponius substriatus Gardner, 1926
- Niponius tamanukii Kono, 1937
- Niponius tenuis Sengupta & Pal, 1995
- Niponius unidentatus Lewis, 1913
- Niponius unistrius Lewis, 1913
- Niponius variabilis Gardner, 1926
- Niponius yamasakii Miwa, 1934
