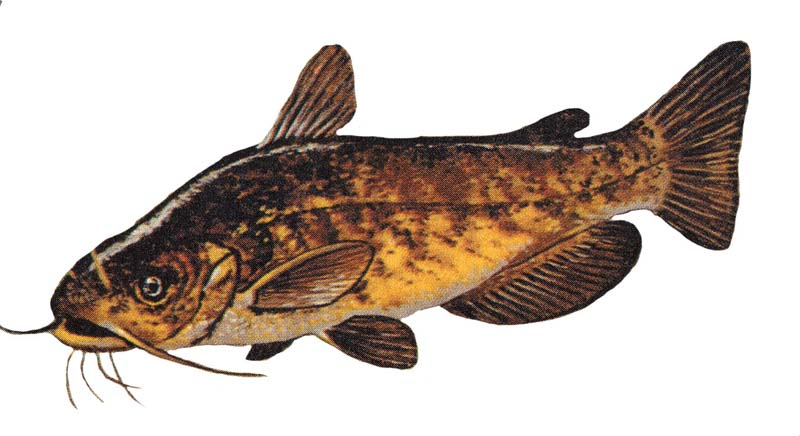
- Ameiurus nebulosus

Scientific classification
- Kingdom: Animalia
- Phylum: Chordata
- Class: Actinopterygii
- Division: Teleostei
- Order: Siluriformes
- Family: Ictaluridae
- Genus: Ameiurus; Rafinesque, 1820

Type species
- Silurus lividus Rafinesque 1820

Synonyms
- Amiurus Agassiz, 1846; Gronias Cope, 1864

= Ameiurus =

Ameiurus Temporal range: Late Eocene - recent

Genus of fishes

Ameiurus is a genus of catfishes in the family Ictaluridae. It contains the three common types of bullhead catfish found in waters of the United States, the black bullhead (Ameiurus melas), the brown bullhead (Ameiurus nebulosus), and the yellow bullhead (Ameiurus natalis), as well as other species, such as the white catfish (Ameiurus catus or Ictalurus catus), which are not typically called "bullheads".

The species known as bullheads can be distinguished from channel catfish and blue catfish by their squared tailfins, rather than forked.

== Taxonomy and fossil record ==
Ameiurus is recognized as monophyletic, meaning it forms a natural group. It is mostly closely related to the clade formed by the genera Noturus, Prietella, Satan, and Pylodictis. Up to the late 20th century, they were generally considered a subgenus of Ictalurus.

There is a sister group relationship between the species A. melas and A. nebulosus.

Fossil remains of Ameiurus are known throughout North America, dating back to the Late Eocene. These remains suggest that the genus ranged as far west as Idaho, eastern Oregon, and eastern Washington during the Neogene.

== Species ==
=== Extant species ===
There are currently seven recognized species in this genus:

- Ameiurus brunneus (D. S. Jordan, 1877) (Snail bullhead)
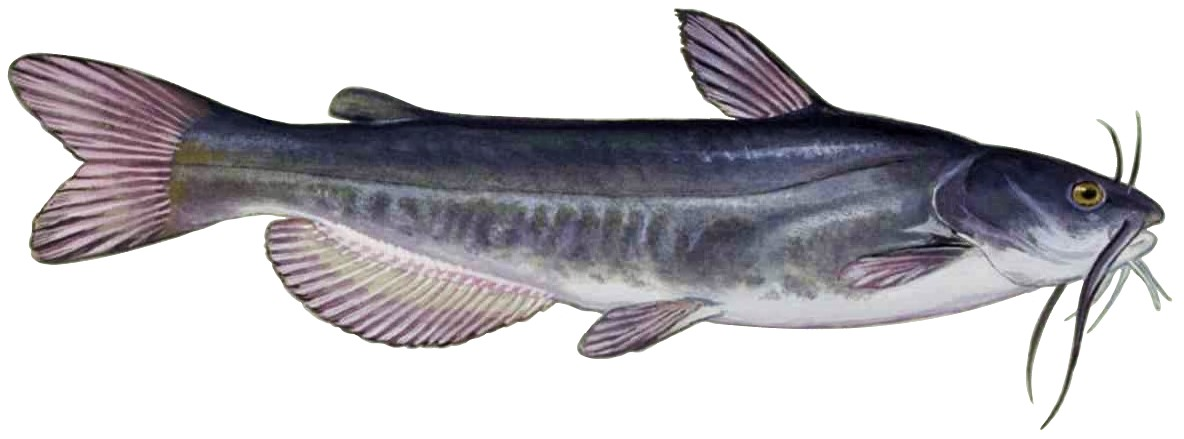
- Ameiurus catus (Linnaeus, 1758) (White bullhead)
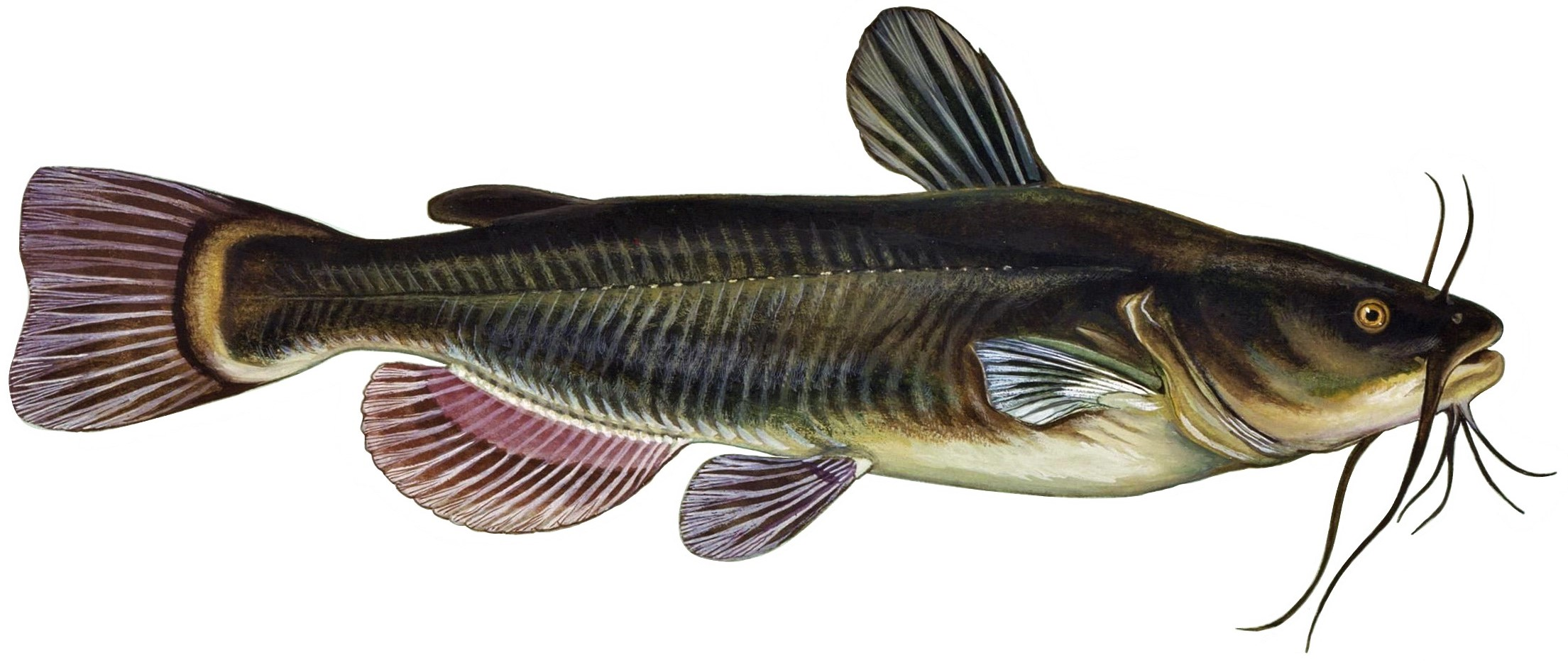
- Ameiurus melas (Rafinesque, 1820) (Black bullhead)
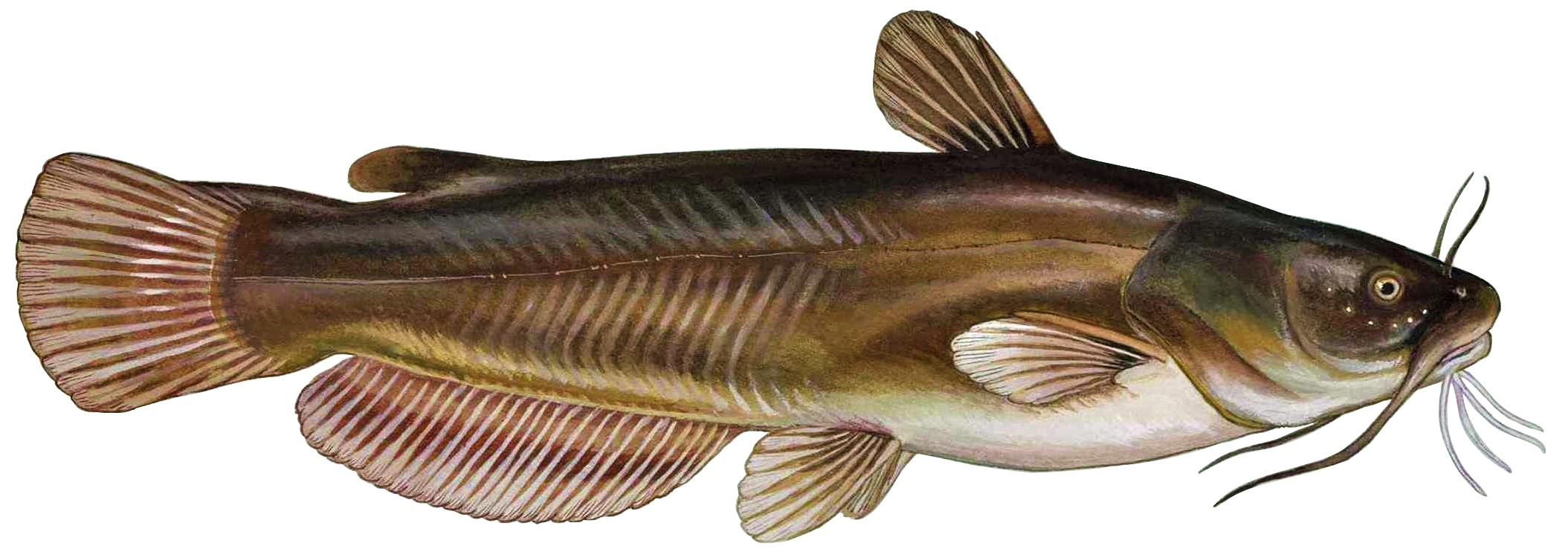
- Ameiurus natalis (Lesueur, 1819) (Yellow bullhead)
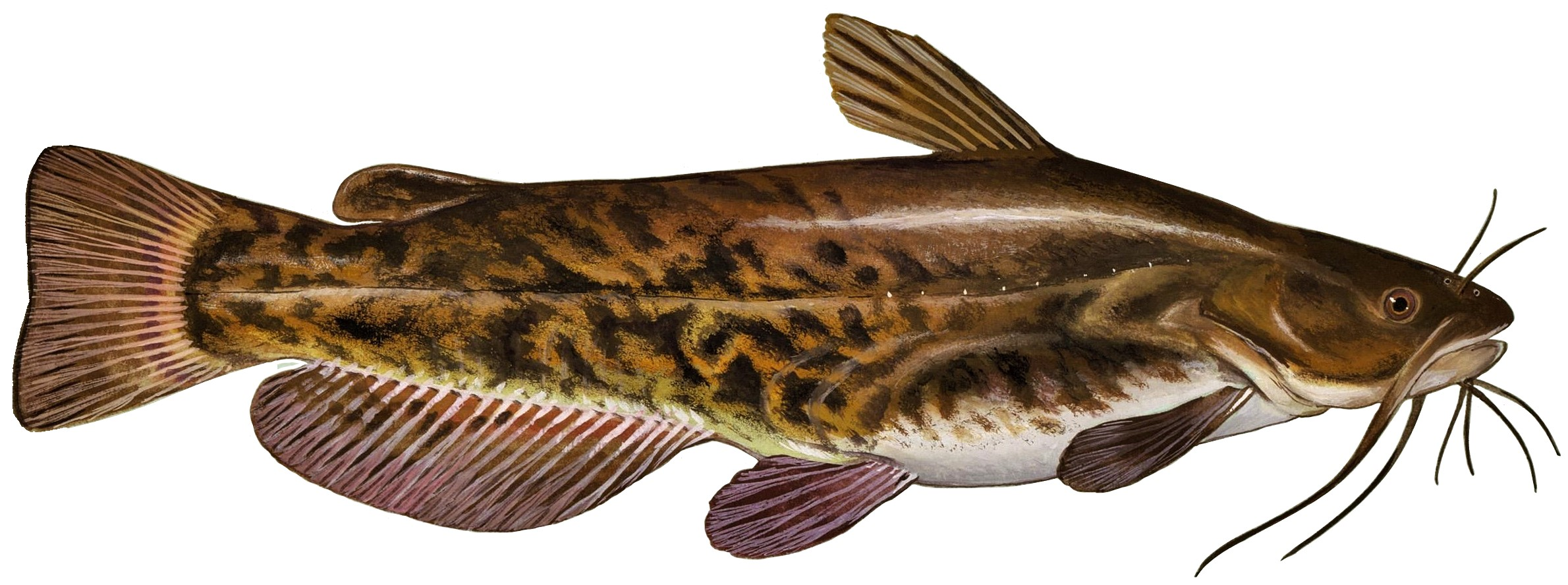
- Ameiurus nebulosus (Lesueur, 1819) (Brown bullhead)
- Ameiurus platycephalus (Girard, 1859) (Flat bullhead)
- Ameiurus serracanthus (Yerger & Relyea, 1968) (Spotted bullhead)

=== Extinct species ===
There are currently ten recognized fossil species in this genus: The oldest, A. pectinatus, gives a minimum age estimate for the genus at approximately 30 million years, during the Late Eocene.

- †Ameiurus grangerensis Smith, Martin & Carpenter, 2018 - Late Miocene of Washington, USA (Ellensburg Formation)
- †Ameiurus hazenensis (Baumgartner, 1982) - Late Miocene of Nevada, USA (Truckee Formation)
- †Ameiurus lavetti (Lundberg, 1975) - Pliocene of Kansas, USA (Ogalalla Formation)
- †Ameiurus leidyi (Lundberg, 1975) - Late Miocene of Nebraska, USA (Lower Snake Creek beds)
- †Ameiurus macgrewi (Lundberg, 1975) - Middle Miocene of Wyoming, USA
- †Ameiurus pectinatus (Cope, 1874) - Late Eocene of Colorado, USA (Florissant Formation)
- †Ameiurus peregrinus (Lundberg, 1975) - mid-late Miocene of Oregon, USA (Juntura Formation)
- †Ameiurus reticulatus Smith, Morgan & Gustafson, 2000 - Pliocene of Washington, USA (Ringold Formation)
- †Ameiurus sawrockensis (Smith, 1962) - Pliocene of Kansas, USA (Rexroad Formation)
- †Ameiurus vespertinus (Miller & Smith, 1967) - Late Pliocene of Idaho, USA (Glenns Ferry Formation)

== Distribution ==
Living species of Ameiurus catfishes are natively distributed east of the North American continental divide, from their westernmost point in central Montana, south to Texas, in streams of the Gulf of Mexico and Atlantic Coast, north to New Brunswick and Quebec, Ontario, Manitoba, and Saskatchewan.

== Habitat ==
Bullheads live in a variety of habitats, including brackish and/or low oxygen ponds, rivers and lakes, although they are seldom stocked intentionally. They are bottom feeders and eat virtually anything edible, including dead fish, insects, other fish, grain, fruit, crayfish and more. Because of their limited use as for sport, they are usually caught while trying to catch other fish, and few anglers pursue them specifically. Persons looking to catch bullheads will use the same bait as they would for channel catfish, including cut bait, chicken livers, blood-soaked meal, or other pungent baits. In the Northeastern US, bullheads are often sold to restaurants in the spring for "fish fries" by amateur fisher folk by the 5 gallon bucket load. Like all catfish, bullheads have a sense of smell that is more developed than most canines.

== Description and identification ==
Bullheads do not get as large as the other catfishes native to North America, with average sizes in the one to two-pound range and world record sizes well under 10 pounds (4.5 kg).

All three major bullheads can be confused with other catfishes by novice anglers. Because they have an unforked tail, many people mistakenly think small flathead catfish are bullheads. Both have the squared tail, and can have a mottled, brown appearance (in the case of the brown bullhead), but the flathead lower lip protrudes farther than its upper lip and it has a flat or "shovel" head. They also have very different habits and habitat.

Flatheads generally eat only live things, while bullheads will freely eat dead fish or other small animals. The flathead is more likely to be found at the bottom of dams or in gravel pits, while bullheads are found more often in the more murky areas. Additionally, flatheads can reach weights well in excess of 100 pounds (45 kg), while the current world's record for any bullhead is a black bullhead, recorded at 8 pounds (3.6 kg) even while the average adult is perhaps 2 pounds (0.91 kg). Brown and yellow bullheads are significantly smaller.

== Relationship to humans ==
They are considered rough fish by many, and are seldom caught for food, although they can be quite edible if caught in clear water and prepared correctly. In Minnesota, bullhead are important to commercial fishermen, who harvest about 1 million pounds a year. Bullheads can make excellent live bait for larger catfish species such as flathead catfish in states where legal. Bullhead catfish can quickly become overpopulated in ponds, and proper management techniques must be employed in order to properly maintain bullhead populations.

On July 12, 1940, in Waterville, southern Minnesota a commercial bullhead fisherman named Bryant Baumgartner killed plainclothes game wardens Marcus Whipps, A. Melvin Holt, and Dudley Brady, who were investigating his operation. The killings became known as The Bullhead Murders, as researched by James M. Keller for his 2012 book, "Tragedy on Fish Row: The Waterville Shootings." Baumgartner then killed himself. The DNR unveiled a memorial to the three slain conservation wardens in June 2011 in nearby New Ulm.

In the early 20th century local people could sell their catch for cents on the pound, more if cleaned. Wholesalers would pack the fish for market where eager customers sought out the cheap protein. However, Minnesota restricted its bullhead limit to 50 per day in 1939 due to concern about overfishing of bullheads with nets, and the state's wardens were actively monitoring commercial fishing operations for compliance at the time of the 1940 murders.

The black bullhead flourished in waters polluted by sewers, mink farms, chicken and livestock processors, and other largely unregulated waste producers. What wasn't sold for human consumption, the guts, bones, skins, and heads became food for mink ranches. Scott Mackenthun, a fisheries biologist with the Minnesota DNR, said black bullhead abundance has declined statewide the past 40 years after the Clean Water Act took effect in 1972.
