= C. americanus =

C. americanus may refer to:

- Camponotus americanus, an ant species in the genus Camponotus
- Ceanothus americanus, a plant species
- Coccyzus americanus, a bird species
- Culex americanus, a mosquito species

== See also ==
- Americanus (disambiguation)
