= Aspergillus brunneus =

Scientific classification
- Kingdom: Fungi
- Division: Ascomycota
- Class: Eurotiomycetes
- Order: Eurotiales
- Family: Aspergillaceae
- Genus: Aspergillus
- Species: A. brunneus

Binomial name
- Aspergillus brunneus Delacroix (1893)

Species of fungus

Aspergillus brunneus is a species of fungus in the genus Aspergillus. It is from the Aspergillus section. The species was first described in 1893. It has been reported to produce asperflavin, asperentins, auroglaucin, bisanthrons, dihydroauroglaucin, echinulins, 5-farnesyl-5,7-dihydroxy-4-methylphthalide, erythroglaucin, flavoglaucin, isoechinulins, mycophenolic acid, neoechinulins, physcion, questin, tetracyclic, and tetrahydroauroglaucin.

== Growth and morphology ==
A. brunneus has been cultivated on both Czapek yeast extract agar (CYA) plates and Malt Extract Agar Oxoid® (MEAOX) plates. The growth morphology of the colonies can be seen in the pictures below.

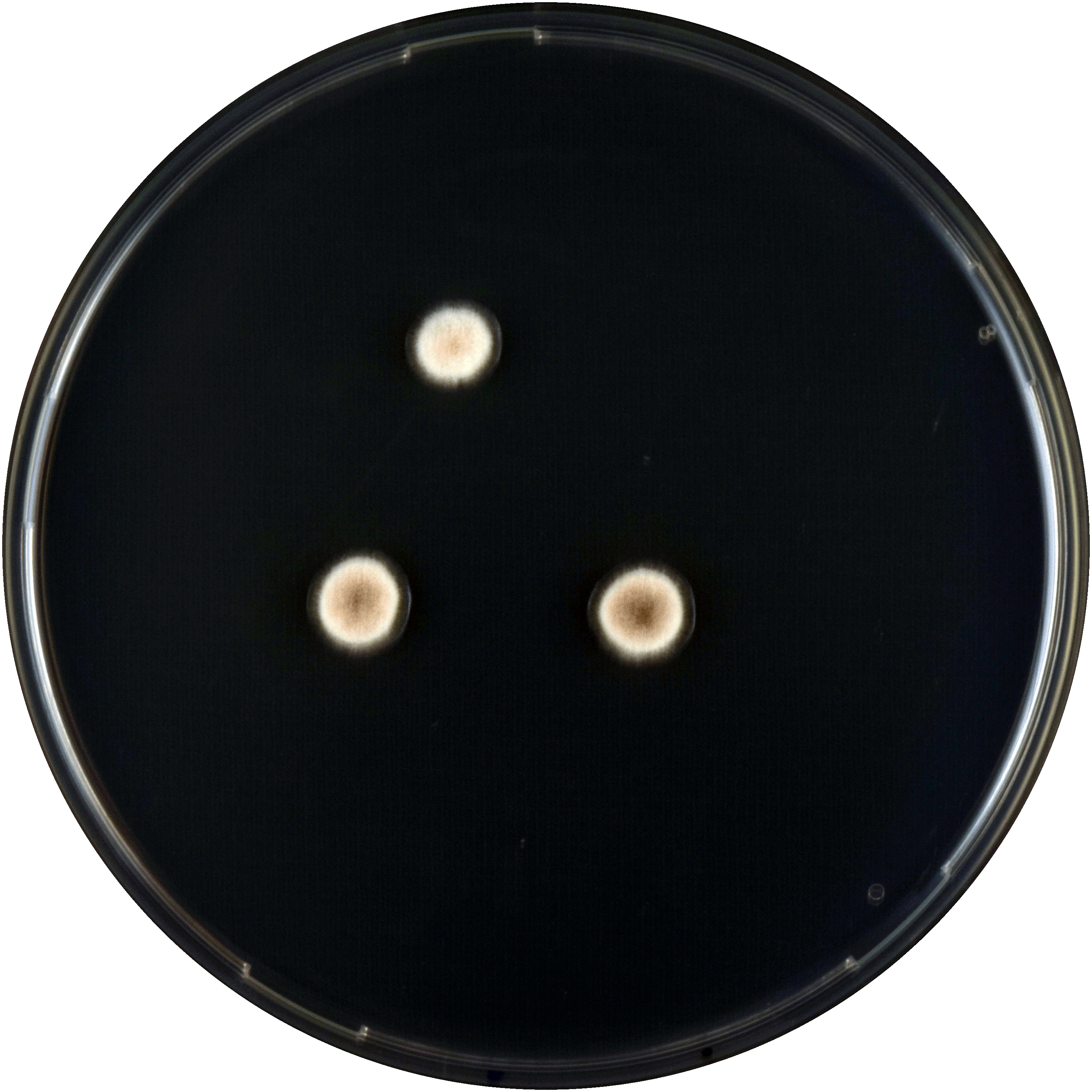
Aspergillus brunneus growing on CYA plate

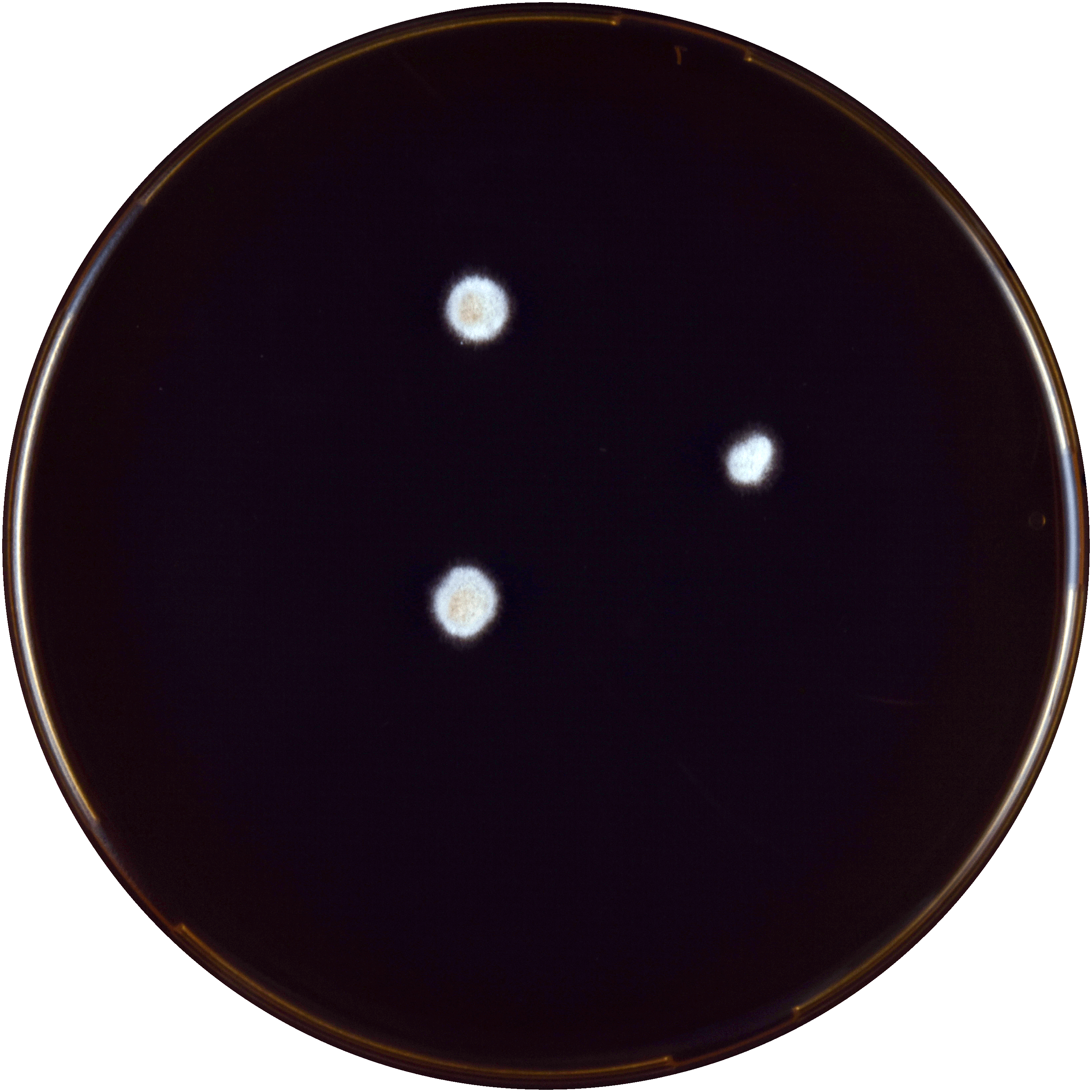
Aspergillus brunneus growing on MEAOX plate
