= Acanthiophilus brunneus =

Scientific classification
- Kingdom: Animalia
- Phylum: Arthropoda
- Class: Insecta
- Order: Diptera
- Family: Tephritidae
- Subfamily: Tephritinae
- Tribe: Tephritini
- Genus: Acanthiophilus
- Species: A. brunneus

Binomial name
- Acanthiophilus brunneus Munro, 1934

Species of fruit fly

Acanthiophilus brunneus is a species of tephritid or fruit flies in the genus Acanthiophilus of the family Tephritidae.

== Distribution ==
Ethiopia, Congo, Uganda, Kenya.
