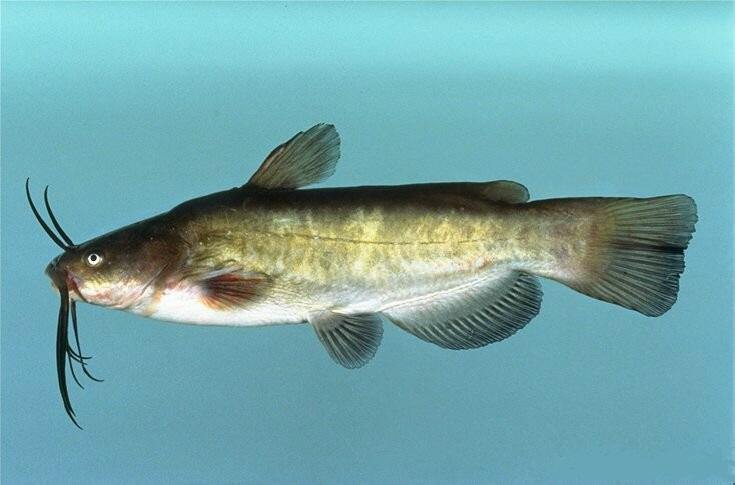

Conservation status
- Least Concern (IUCN 3.1)

Scientific classification
- Kingdom: Animalia
- Phylum: Chordata
- Class: Actinopterygii
- Order: Siluriformes
- Family: Ictaluridae
- Genus: Ameiurus
- Species: A. nebulosus

Binomial name
- Ameiurus nebulosus (Lesueur, 1819)

Synonyms
- Ictalurus nebulosus (Lesueur, 1819); Pimelodus nebulosus Lesueur, 1819; Pimelodus dekayi Girard, 1859; Pimelodus atrarius DeKay, 1842; Pimelodus felis Agassiz, 1850; Pimelodus hoyi Girard, 1859; Pimelodus marmoratus Holbrook, 1855; Amiurus mispilliensis Cope, 1870; Gronias nigrilabris Cope, 1864; Ictalurus nebulosus pannonicus Harka & Pinter, 1990; Pimelodus pullus DeKay, 1842; Pimelodus vulgaris Thompson, 1842; Pimelodus vulpeculus Girard, 1859

= Brown bullhead =

North American catfish species

The brown bullhead (Ameiurus nebulosus) is a fish of the family Ictaluridae that is widely distributed in North America. It is a species of bullhead catfish and is similar to the black bullhead (Ameiurus melas) and yellow bullhead (Ameiurus natalis). It was originally described as Pimelodus nebulosus by Charles Alexandre Lesueur in 1819, and is also referred to as Ictalurus nebulosus.

The brown bullhead is also widely known as the "mud pout", "horned pout", "hornpout", or simply "mud cat", a name also used with the other bullhead species.

The brown bullhead is important as a clan symbol of the Ojibwe people. In their tradition, the bullhead or wawaazisii is one of six beings that came out of the sea to form the original clans.

== Appearance ==
The brown bullhead grows to be approximately 21 inches (53 cm) in length and is a darker brown-green dorsally, growing lighter green and yellow towards the ventral surface. The belly is off-white or cream, and the fish has no scales. Additionally, there are darker, brown-black speckles along the entire surface of the fish. The brown bullhead has a dorsal fin that bears a spine, a single adipose fin posterior to the dorsal fin, abdominal pelvic fins, and an anal fin with 21 to 24 rays. The tail is only slightly notched, with the dorsal and ventral lobes angling inward. The pectoral fins have spines that bear five to eight serrated teeth on their posterior edge. The fish has eight barbels around its mouth. The barbels on the chin are black to yellowish brown. Juvenile brown bullheads are similar in appearance, but are more likely to be of a single solid color.

The brown bullhead's mouth is terminal or slightly subterminal, with the upper jaw projecting slightly past the lower jaw. This position enables bottom feeding. The brown bullhead may be distinguished from flathead catfish (Pylodictis olivaris) by the absence of lateral posterior extensions on the tooth patch of the brown bullhead's upper jaw. Adult brown bullheads range in size from 200 to 500 mm (7.9 to 19.7 in) and weigh between 0.5 kg (1.1 lb) and 3.6 kg (7.9 lb) (in extreme cases). Brown bullheads are ectothermic, heterothermic, and bilaterally symmetrical. Brown bullheads can be distinguished from black and yellow bullheads by their yellow-black chin barbels, the absence of a hypopigmented bar at the base of the tail (which is present in black bullheads), and their 21–24 anal fin rays.

== Distribution ==
The native range of the brown bullhead is in the Atlantic and Gulf Slope drainages. More specifically, it is found from Nova Scotia and New Brunswick to Mobile Bay, Alabama, and in the Great Lakes, Hudson Bay, and Mississippi River basins (from Quebec to Saskatchewan, south to Louisiana, and west to Texas). However, there is evidence that the brown bullhead was historically absent from the Gulf Coast west of the Apalachicola River and east of the Mississippi River. The species is also abundant in many regions as a result of stocking for food or sport. These locations include Georgia, Alabama, Arizona, Arkansas, California, Colorado, Hawaii, Idaho, Kansas, Kentucky, Louisiana, Maine, Missouri, Nebraska, Nevada, New Hampshire, New Mexico, Ohio, Oklahoma, Oregon, Virginia, and Washington. Brown bullheads are a social non-migratory species that are known to form schools.

== Habitat ==
The brown bullhead thrives in a variety of habitats, including lakes, ponds, and slow-moving streams with low oxygen or muddy conditions. In many areas of the United States, brown bullheads are opportunistic bottom feeders. The species has few natural predators and is not popular with anglers in most areas (albeit very popular in some such as the Oneida Lake area of Upstate New York, where it is featured each spring by local restaurants), so it has thrived. Catfish are found in a variety of habitats, from lakes or murky ponds to drainage ditches. They are scarce during the day, but come out at night to feed, searching the bottom of a lake or river for food. They eat insects, leeches, snails, fish, clams, and many plants. They are also known to eat corn, which can be used as bait. Similarly to other catfish, they spawn only after the temperature of the water has reached 80 °F (27 °C) in June and July. However, cooler temperatures are required before brown bullheads will spawn in the northern US.

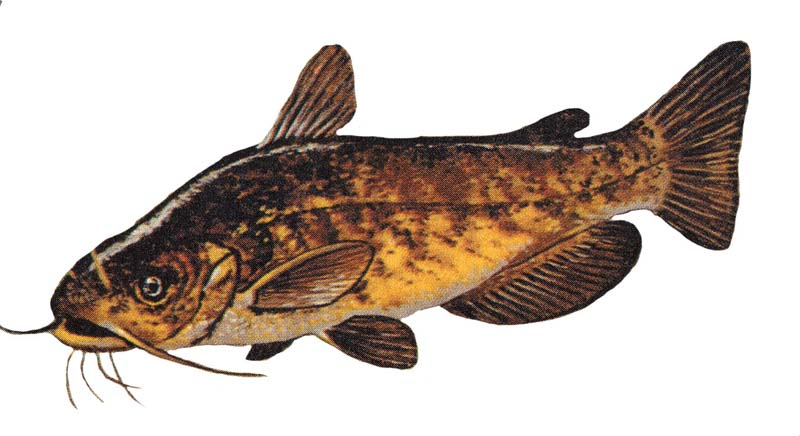
Brown bullhead, Ameiurus nebulosus

Brown bullheads can withstand a wide range of water temperatures and low oxygen levels. Brown bullheads can survive waters with heavy pollution and dissolved oxygen values as low as 0.2 ppm. Because of bullheads' tolerance of low oxygen levels, they are less threatened by winterkill and are capable of surviving in relatively extreme environments.

== Fishing ==
This catfish is easily caught with natural bait such as worms and chicken livers. They have a scrappy but not unusually strong fight. Anglers often catch them by fishing off the bottom. When caught in very clear water when the flesh is firm and reddish to pinkish, the hornpout is quite edible and delicious. Nevertheless, its genial cousins such as the channel catfish and the blue catfish are better known for their use as food. In most areas, they will not exceed two pounds in weight, with a current International Game Fish Association world record of 7 pounds 6 ounces (3.3 kg).

== Life cycle and reproduction ==
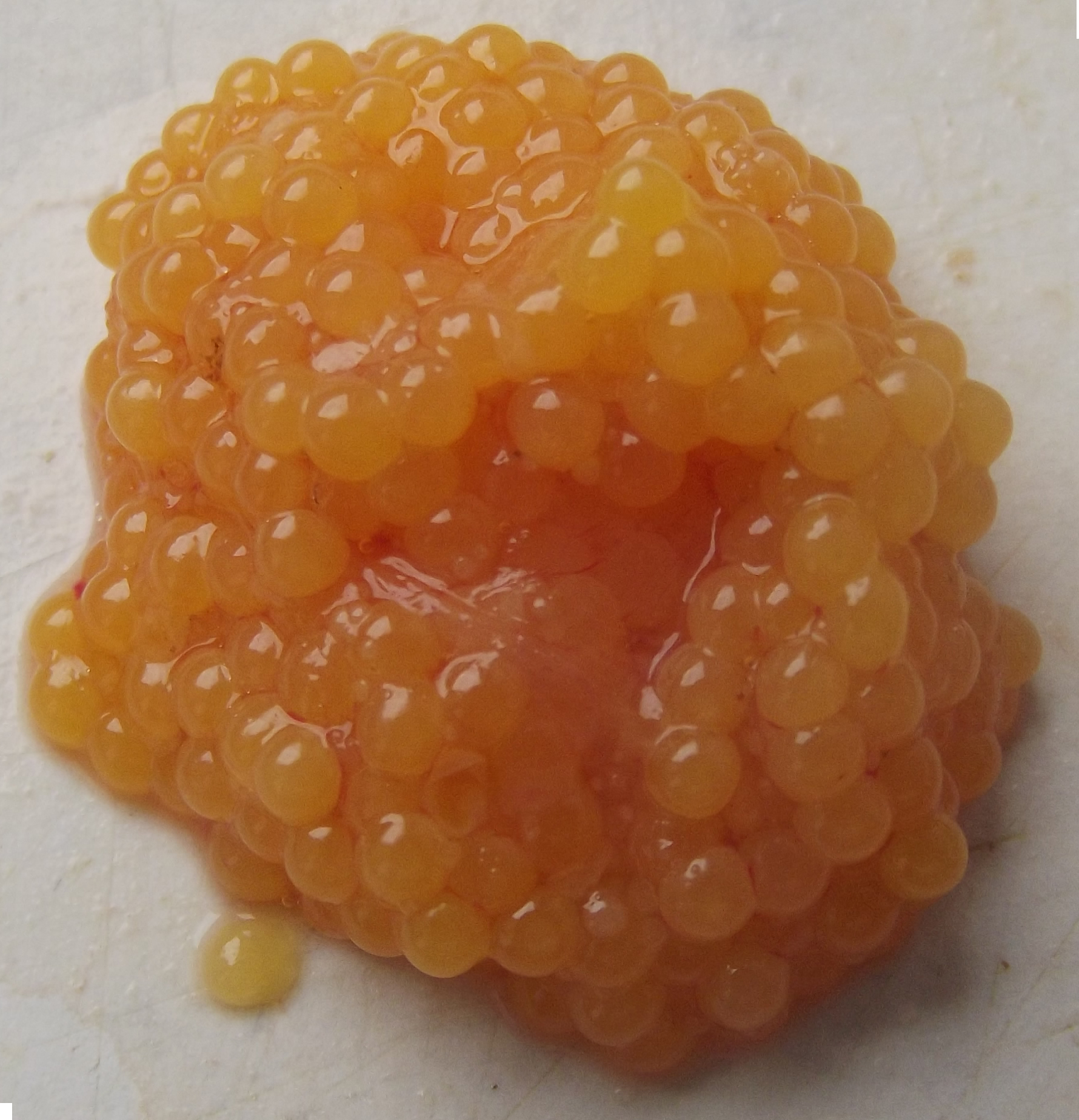
Brown bullhead roe

Brown bullheads typically live between six and eight years, but have been recorded as old as fifteen in captivity. The species spawns between April and June. For the duration of each breeding season, females will be monogamous. There are no consistent behaviors of mate attraction. The females lay eggs in dark locations such as under rocks and inside logs, where they are externally fertilized by the male. The fish face opposite one another during the fertilization process. Nests are primarily created by females, but the eggs are protected by both sexes. An egg cluster in a nest may contain between 50 and 10,000 eggs. The eggs usually take six days to hatch, but may take up to 13 days. Both parents generally care for their offspring for an additional five days after the eggs hatch. The young are kept in a school by a parent for up to one month. They will remain in schools as juveniles.

Brown bullheads, both male and female, will reach sexual maturity around age three. Brown bullheads have occasionally been recorded eating their own eggs.

== As an invasive species ==
The fish has been introduced into many European countries, such as Poland, Germany, Sweden, Norway, Finland, Romania, Estonia, Hungary, Serbia, and Croatia. Brown bullheads have also been introduced to western North America, Chile, Puerto Rico and New Zealand.

Countries who have reported adverse effects from the introduction of the brown bullhead species include Iran and Turkey.

== Diet ==
Brown bullheads are omnivorous benthic bottom feeders. Their diet consists of algae, leeches, worms, mollusks, crustaceans, insects, crayfish, other smaller fish species and fish eggs. Brown bullheads are typically nocturnal feeders, but have been reported to feed diurnally. Bullheads have poor eyesight and are heavily reliant on their sensitive barbels to locate their food. The fish are omnivorous and will reportedly eat almost anything that fits in their mouth.

== Predation ==
Brown bullheads are the most susceptible to predators in their developmental stages, primarily as eggs. They are prey to the following species: northern pike, muskellunge, largemouth bass, walleye, snapping turtles, water snakes, green herons, yellow perch, and sunfish. Additionally, brown bullheads are used for small-scale commercial fishing, recreational fishing, and more specifically for consumption and research. Predation by other fish and coexisting species is only a realistic threat to bullheads under four inches (10 cm), while the biggest threat to adult bullheads is humans. Brown bullheads have protective coloration to avoid predation. As a mode of physical defense against predators, bullhead species have a sharp spine on the leading edge of their dorsal and pectoral fins. To use this adaptation as a defense mechanism, bullheads will stiffen the spine while being attacked, impeding the predator's ability to swallow while simultaneously releasing a venom to sting and burn the predator.

== Conservation ==
Brown bullheads hold no special status on the International Union for Conservation of Nature and Natural Resources, the United States Endangered Species Program, or under the CITES appendix. Brown bullheads can tolerate very low dissolved oxygen levels that result from industrial and domestic pollution, aiding in their overall high rate of survivorship. Brown bullheads are the most abundant species in many lakes and streams across the continent.

In Missouri, the brown bullhead is listed as a Species of Conservation Concern and is threatened by habitat destruction, particularly the drainage of swamps in the Missouri Bootheel for conversion into farmland.

== Transmissible cancer ==
In 2026, a clonally transmissible form of melanoma was identified among brown bullheads in Lake Memphramagog.

== See also ==
- Bullhead catfish (general)
- Rough fish
