= Agniohammus brunneus =

Scientific classification
- Kingdom: Animalia
- Phylum: Arthropoda
- Class: Insecta
- Order: Coleoptera
- Suborder: Polyphaga
- Infraorder: Cucujiformia
- Family: Cerambycidae
- Genus: Agniohammus
- Species: A. brunneus

Binomial name
- Agniohammus brunneus (Breuning, 1967)

Synonyms
- Elongatorsidis brunneus Breuning, 1967

Species of beetle

Agniohammus brunneus is a species of beetle in the family Cerambycidae. It was described by Stephan von Breuning in 1967, originally under the genus Elongatorsidis. It is known from Borneo.
