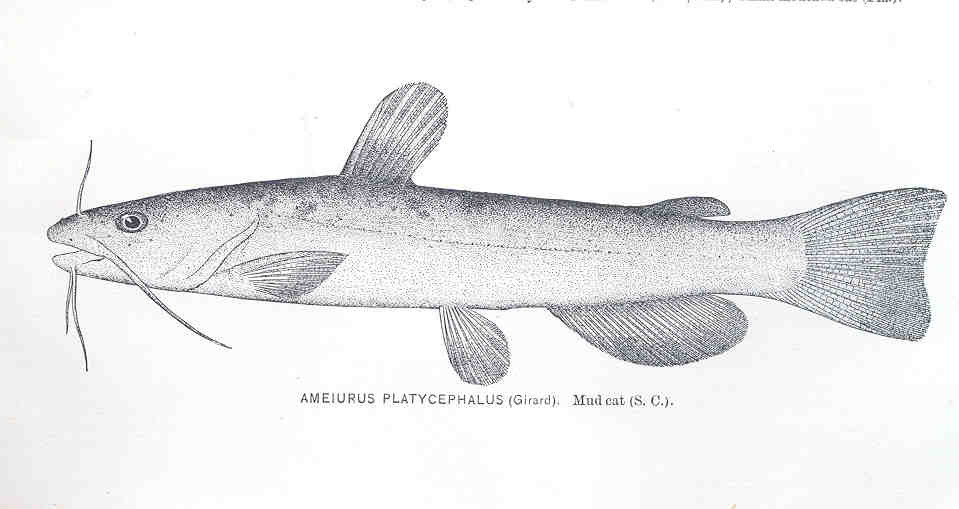

Conservation status
- Least Concern (IUCN 3.1)

Scientific classification
- Kingdom: Animalia
- Phylum: Chordata
- Class: Actinopterygii
- Order: Siluriformes
- Family: Ictaluridae
- Genus: Ameiurus
- Species: A. platycephalus

Binomial name
- Ameiurus platycephalus (Girard, 1859)

Synonyms
- Pimelodus platycephalus Girard, 1859; Ictalurus platycephalus (Girard, 1859)

= Ameiurus platycephalus =

Flat bullhead

Species of fish

Ameiurus platycephalus, the flat bullhead, is a species of North American freshwater catfish native to the waters of the southeastern United States from Virginia to Georgia. This species grows to a maximum length of 29 cm (11 in) TL though it is more commonly about 23 cm (9 in) long.

== Distribution and habitat ==
The flat bullhead is native to the southeastern United States where it is found in the lower parts of the drainages of the North American Atlantic Slope. Its range extends from the upper parts of the James River and the Roanoke River in Virginia, to the Altamaha River in Georgia. Its occurrence is widespread, it being present in all the drainages of South Carolina, for example. Its typical habitat is slow-moving, quiet stretches of rivers over mud or sandy bottoms, or over rock when it is covered with organic debris. It also occurs in lakes, ponds and behind dams, and younger individuals favour clear streams.

== Ecology ==
This fish feeds on aquatic insects, molluscs, and small fish, with vegetation and detritus also being taken. Females mature when they are three years old. Breeding takes place during the summer, the fecundity of the females being between 200 and 1740 eggs each.

== Status ==
While not caught for food, the flat bullhead is threatened by the predatory flathead catfish (Pylodictis olivaris) and blue catfish (Ictalurus furcatus), both of which have been introduced into its range. Other threats include water pollution, sedimentation, impoundment and changes in water quality. It is generally an uncommon species, but has a wide range, and the International Union for Conservation of Nature (IUCN) has assessed its conservation status as being of "least concern".
