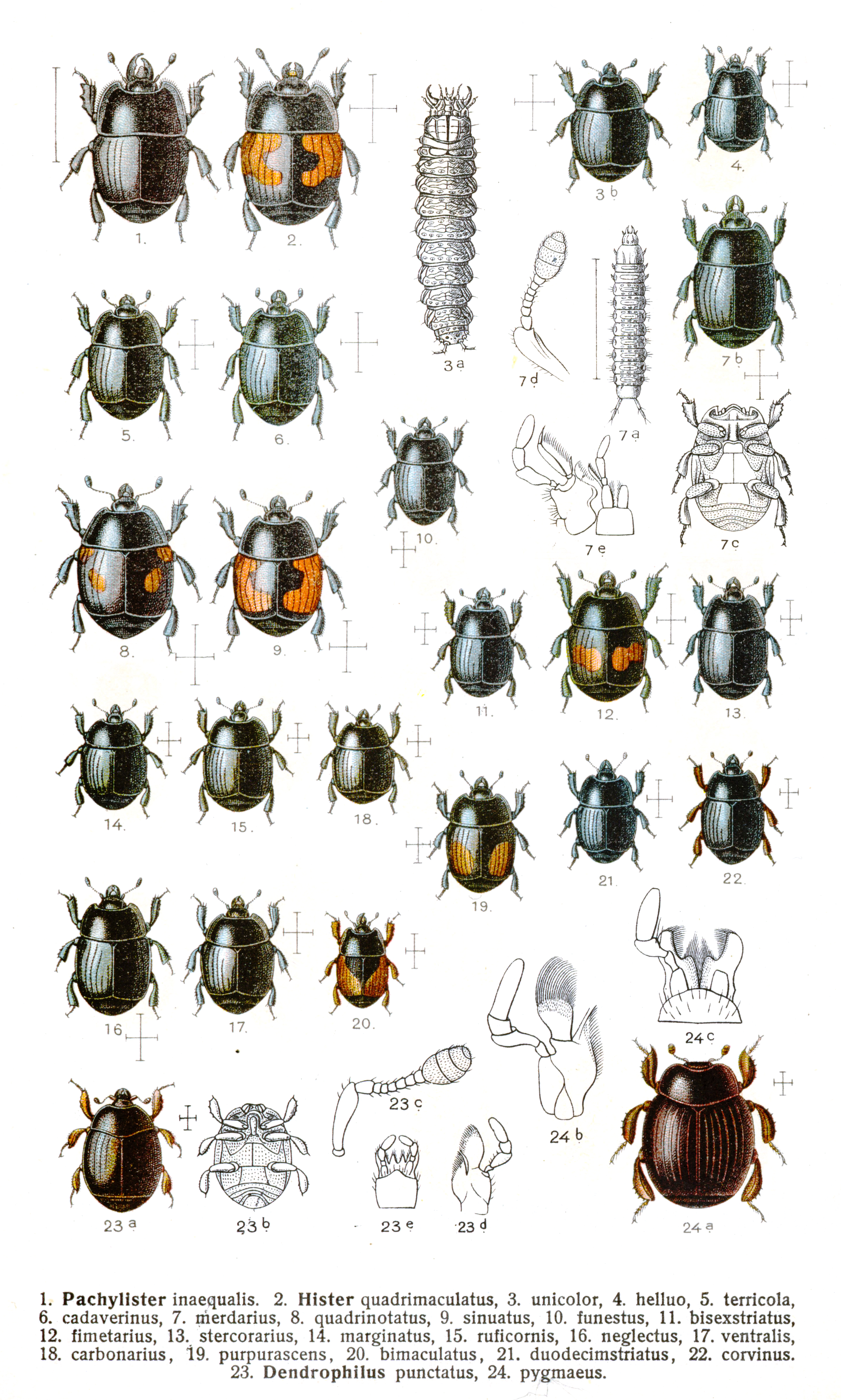
- Central European clown beetles with larvae and anatomical details

Scientific classification
- Kingdom: Animalia
- Phylum: Arthropoda
- Clade: Pancrustacea
- Class: Insecta
- Order: Coleoptera
- Suborder: Polyphaga
- Infraorder: Staphyliniformia
- Superfamily: Histeroidea
- Family: Histeridae; Gyllenhal, 1808

Subfamilies
- Abraeinae MacLeay, 1819; Chlamydopsinae Bickhardt, 1914; Dendrophilinae Reitter, 1909; Haeteriinae Marseul, 1857; Histerinae Gyllenhal, 1808; Niponiinae Fowler, 1912; Onthophilinae MacLeay, 1819; Saprininae Blanchard, 1845; Tribalinae Bickhardt, 1914; Trypanaeinae Marseul, 1857; Trypeticinae Bickhardt, 1913

Diversity
- at least 410 genera

= Histeridae =

Histeridae Temporal range: Early Cretaceous–Present

Family of beetles

Histeridae is a family of beetles commonly known as clown beetles or hister beetles. There are more than 410 genera and 4,800 described species in Histeridae worldwide, with more than 500 species in North America. They can be identified by their shortened elytra, which leave two tergites exposed, and also by their elbowed antennae with clubbed ends. These predatory feeders are most active at night and will fake death if threatened. Hister beetles occupy almost any kind of niche throughout the world. They have also been useful for estimation of time of death during forensic investigations. Also, certain species are used for controlling houseflies and livestock pests that infest dung.

== Etymology ==
Histeridae was first named by Leonard Gyllenhaal. Histeridae has two common names, the clown beetle and the hister beetle. There have been several theories which explain the origin of these names. One theory for "hister" comes from the work of Juvenal, a Roman poet. Juvenal used the word "hister" to mean a dirty, lowly being. Another theory for the origin of this beetle's name stems from the fact that in Latin, "hister" means actor, and these beetles play dead when disturbed.

== Characteristics ==
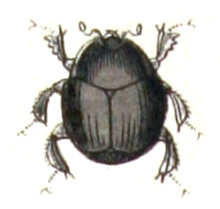
Hister unicolor

Hister beetles can be identified by their elytra, which are shorter than the abdomen and typically leave two of the seven tergites exposed. Their elytra are typically glabrous and black or metallic green, and their protibiae are flattened and toothed. Hister beetles have specialized heads that can retract into their prothorax and two lamellate antennae with clubbed ends. Most beetles in this family are flattened and oval in shape.

== Habitat ==
Hister beetles can be found throughout the world in various habitats. The majority of Histeridae species prefer dried or decaying habitats. They can be found on dung or carrion, dead vegetation, tree bark, burrows, and ant or termite colonies. Histeridae live in widespread habitats because they feed on other arthropods and live in areas where their prey is found, such as carrion and dung, where maggots can be found.

== Evolutionary history ==
The oldest record of the family is Antigracilus from the Aptian age of the Cretaceous period, in the Yixian Formation of China. Antigracilus is the sister species to all living members of the family. The oldest crown group representatives are known from Burmese amber around 99 million years old. This includes beetles belonging to the extant subfamily Haeteriinae, and the extant genus Onthophilus.

== Feeding habits ==
The larval and adult forms of Histeridae feed on dung, carrion, decomposing vegetation, and other insects,. Hister beetles are able to locate both dung and carrion with their sense of smell. When found on dung, carrion and vegetation, hister beetles typically feed on the fly larvae found there. The hister beetle will feed on soft-bodied insect eggs and larvae, particularly on flies. Some species of Histeridae will even feed on other Histeridae.

Some Histeridae species live in a nest with ants and termites. Some of these beetles are fed by the ants, while others simply feed on leftover insect larvae that the ants do not want. However, in their adult stage, some Psiloscelis will actually feed on adult ants.

Because Histeridae are predaceous, they can be utilized to control pests, but must be stored in isolation, as they can be cannibalistic. The hister beetles have been useful in the control of pest flies in poultry houses and pastures, and also against pest beetles of stored food products.

== Development ==
Histeridae undergo holometabolous development, going through egg, larva, pupa and adult stages.

=== Egg ===
The average time of development from egg to adult at 30 °C (86 °F) is 20.5 days. The eggs of most species are off-white and oval in shape and take on average, 3.8 days to hatch into the first instar. The chorion is shiny and smooth, but in certain species like Epierus or Platylomalus it can look pale brown and be leathery in texture.

=== Larval ===
The larval stage of this beetle typically goes through two instars, and the second instar is the longest stage of its entire development, taking up 39% of its overall development time. It takes 5.1 days on average for the first instar to develop into the second. The larval form of the insect will range in length from three millimeters to several centimeters. They have a membranous body with a limited amount of sclerotization around the head. There is some pigmentation around the horizontally segmented body. The legs are short and are not very useful for locomotion, so they move through muscular contraction.

=== Pupal ===
The pupal form of the beetle is similar in appearance to the adult form, with outer cells produced in the larval stages and reinforced with proteinaceous cement. This makes their outer shell harder and protects them during this vulnerable stage. While they pupate, they breathe through spiracles on the abdomen. The beetle is non-feeding and immobile in this stage, as their internal structure is breaking down and rebuilding into adult form. Under good temperature conditions, the hister beetle will stay in the pupal stage for about a week.

=== Reproduction ===
The male and female reproductive organs are hidden underneath the last few sternites on the mesosternal (mesosternum) side. The female's structure is modified as an ovipositor while the male's is adapted as a copulatory structure. The female has oviducts that carry the developed eggs from the ovaries to the ovipositor. The males also have a duct that carries the sperm from the testes to the copulatory structure, which stays concealed until copulation. When fertilization takes place, the male leaves enough sperm in the female to fertilize all the eggs in the female's ovaries. The excess sperm is kept in a special structure called spermatheca which holds the sperm until the eggs are fully developed.

== Subclades ==
There are four major subclades of Histeridae. These subclades are Dendrobites, Geobiotes, Microhisterids, and Inquilines.

Dendrobites

Dendrobites have two common body shapes. One is flattened, while the other has a more cylindrical appearance. The former usually lives near tree bark. This is because the prey they feed on, fly eggs, are found in tree bark. The latter also feed on insects, but prefer to live in forested areas.

Geobiotes

This subclade is the largest and most diverse of the hister subclades. The Geobiotes' body structures are generally circular, and they are known for their digging tendencies. This subclade is separated into five more divisions. The first division of the Geobiotes feed on maggots and eggs that are found in forest vegetation or in carrion. The second and third divisions hunt for arthropods that feed on dead plant matter. The fourth division of Geobiotes feed on fly eggs in dung. The last division of Geobiotes lives in caves and feed on mites and other arthropods that occupy the vegetation and fungi found there. Some of the fifth division's members are blind.

3. Microhisterids

Microhisterids are the smallest of the four subclades. They live on plant litter and feed on the tiny arthropods found there. Like some of the fifth division of Geobiotes, some Microhisterids are known to be blind as well.

4. Inquilines

This division consists of Histeridae that live in close proximity with social colonies of arthropods such as ants and termites. Histeridae that live near ants live in either a harmonious or hostile relationship. The hostile hister beetles feed on the ants. The harmonious hister beetles eat the same food as the ants, however, they may not be in direct competition for the food. These beetles have an excretory organ that produces an odor which prevent ants from attacking.

== Importance in forensics ==
Hister beetles can be used to identify the time of death of dead bodies. Certain species of the hister beetles follow shortly behind flesh eating insects and prey on the maggots and other arthropods present. Insects that feed on dead bodies increase the rate of decomposition, and their mandibular mouth parts can cause damage to the body. Hister beetles can also help determine the season the body died in, as they are more prevalent in spring and summer.

== See also ==
- List of Histeridae genera
