= Calliini =

Scientific classification
- Domain: Eukaryota
- Kingdom: Animalia
- Phylum: Arthropoda
- Class: Insecta
- Order: Coleoptera
- Suborder: Polyphaga
- Infraorder: Cucujiformia
- Family: Cerambycidae
- Subfamily: Lamiinae
- Tribe: Calliini; Thomson, 1864

Tribe of beetles

Calliini is a tribe of longhorn beetles of the subfamily Lamiinae.

== Taxonomy ==
- Acreana Lane, 1973
- Alical Galileo, Santos-Silva & Bezark, 2016
- Amucallia Galileo & Martins, 2008
- Anapsicomus Galileo & Martins, 1988
- Ardeocomus Galileo & Martins, 1988
- Asemolea Bates, 1881
- Callia Audinet-Serville, 1835
- Calliomorpha Lane, 1973
- Callisema Martins & Galileo, 1990
- Callityrinthia Galileo & Martins, 1991
- Camitocomus Galileo & Martins, 1991
- Canindea Galileo & Martins, 1990
- Chalcolyne Bates, 1866
- Chereas Thomson, 1864
- Cicatricallia Martins & Galileo, 2012
- Colombicallia Galileo & Martins, 1992
- Drycothaea Thomson, 1868
- Eumathes Pascoe, 1858
- Eumimesis Bates, 1866
- Euryestola Breuning, 1940
- Graminea Thomson, 1864
- Gryllica Thomson, 1860
- Harringtonia Lane, 1973
- Hastatis Buquet, 1857
- Hemicladus Buquet, 1857
- Hemilophopsis Tavakilian & Santos-Silva, 2019
- Hirticallia Galileo & Martins, 1990
- Icelastatis Galileo & Martins, 1991
- Igualda Thomson, 1868
- Lustrocomus Martins & Galileo, 1996
- Mesestola Breuning, 1980
- Micatocomus Galileo & Martins, 1988
- Miguelia Galileo & Martins, 1991
- Mimolaia Bates, 1881
- Nagma Bezark & Santos-Silva, 2020
- Nappella Santos-Silva, Nascimento & Drumont, 2019
- Neocallia Fisher, 1933
- Pandemicus Bezark & Santos-Silva, 2020
- Paracallia Martins & Galileo, 1998
- Paradrycothaea Galileo & Martins, 2010
- Parasemolea Martins & Galileo, 1990
- Rumuara Martins & Galileo, 1990
- Schiacallia Galileo & Martins, 1991
- Xenocallia Galileo & Martins, 1990
- Zenicomus Thomson, 1868
