= Forsteriini =

Scientific classification
- Kingdom: Animalia
- Phylum: Arthropoda
- Class: Insecta
- Order: Coleoptera
- Suborder: Polyphaga
- Infraorder: Cucujiformia
- Family: Cerambycidae
- Subfamily: Lamiinae
- Tribe: Forsteriini; Tippmann, 1960

Tribe of beetles

Forsteriini is a tribe of longhorn beetles of the subfamily Lamiinae.

== Taxonomy ==
- Bactriola
- Camixaima
- Falsamblesthis
- Gisostola
- Helminda
- Huedepohlia
- Itacolomi
- Lustrocomus
- Neohebestola
- Nyctonympha
- Obereoides
- Proceroblesthis
- Pseudogisostola
- Saepiseuthes
- Spinoblesthis
- Udamina
- Yapyguara
