= Sphallonycha =

Scientific classification
- Domain: Eukaryota
- Kingdom: Animalia
- Phylum: Arthropoda
- Class: Insecta
- Order: Coleoptera
- Suborder: Polyphaga
- Infraorder: Cucujiformia
- Family: Cerambycidae
- Tribe: Calliini
- Genus: Sphallonycha; Bates, 1881
- Species: S. roseicollis

Binomial name
- Sphallonycha roseicollis (Bates, 1866)

Species of beetle

Sphallonycha is a genus of beetles in the family Cerambycidae. It is monotypic, being represented by the single species Sphallonycha roseicollis that is known from Brazil.
