= Ybyrarema =

Scientific classification
- Domain: Eukaryota
- Kingdom: Animalia
- Phylum: Arthropoda
- Class: Insecta
- Order: Coleoptera
- Suborder: Polyphaga
- Infraorder: Cucujiformia
- Family: Cerambycidae
- Tribe: Calliini
- Genus: Ybyrarema; Martins & Galileo, 2014
- Species: Y. irundisa

Binomial name
- Ybyrarema irundisa (Galileo & Martins, 2001)

Synonyms
- (Species): Sphallonycha irundisa Monné & Hovore, 2006; Sphallonycha irundisa Martins & Galileo, 2004

Species of beetle

Ybyrarema is a genus of beetles in the family Cerambycidae. It is monotypic, being represented by the single species Ybyrarema irundisa that is known from Brazil and Ecuador.
