= Piampatara =

Scientific classification
- Domain: Eukaryota
- Kingdom: Animalia
- Phylum: Arthropoda
- Class: Insecta
- Order: Coleoptera
- Suborder: Polyphaga
- Infraorder: Cucujiformia
- Family: Cerambycidae
- Subfamily: Lamiinae
- Tribe: Calliini
- Genus: Piampatara; Martins & Galileo, 1992

Genus of beetles

Piampatara is a genus of longhorn beetles of the subfamily Lamiinae, containing the following species:

- Piampatara humeralis (Aurivillius, 1916)
- Piampatara proseni Martins & Galileo, 1997
- Piampatara ubirajarai (Lane, 1966)
