= Paula Montal Fornés =

Spanish Roman Catholic professed religious

Saint Paula Montal Fornés
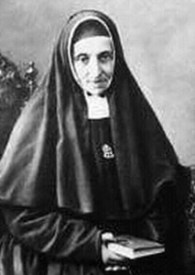
- Photograph.

Religious
- Born: 11 October 1799; Arenys de Mar, Barcelona, Spain
- Died: 26 February 1889 (aged 89); Olesa de Montserrat, Barcelona, Spain
- Venerated in: Roman Catholic Church
- Beatified: 18 April 1993, Saint Peter's Square, Vatican City by Pope John Paul II
- Canonized: 25 November 2001, Saint Peter's Basilica, Vatican City by Pope John Paul II
- Feast: 26 February
- Attributes: Religious habit
- Patronage: Sisters of the Pious Schools; Teachers

Paula Montal Fornés (religious name: Paula of Saint Joseph Calasanz; 11 October 1799 – 26 February 1889) was a Spanish Roman Catholic professed religious and the foundress of the Sisters of the Pious Schools. Montal Fornés dedicated her religious career to serving as an educator in Barcelona where she founded schools for people in the area. The death of her father when she was ten forced her to help her mother raise her siblings though was free to pursue her religious inclinations once this was achieved; she and a close friend began setting up a series of schools before formalizing her idea for the establishment of a religious congregation that would be based on education and the establishment of additional schools nationwide.

Montal Fornés' cause for sainthood opened several decades after her death in the 1950s after being titled as a Servant of God; confirmation of her heroic virtue in 1988 saw her named as Venerable. Pope John Paul II beatified the late religious on 18 April 1993 and later canonized her on 25 November 2001.

== Life ==
Paula Montal Fornés was born on 11 October 1799 as the eldest of five daughters to Ramon Montal and Vicenta Fornés; she was born into her father's second marriage. Her father died when she was ten and as a result of this she had to work as a lace-maker and as a seamstress in order to help her mother raise her siblings. Fornés extended this care to the other children in her parish.

In 1829 she desired to devote herself to God and both she and her friend Inés Busquets opened a school in Girona to provide an education and a spiritual education to all those who needed it most. The school became a quick success and she was able to establish a college in May 1842 in her hometown and another later in 1846 in Sabadell. Fornés established her own religious order on 2 February 1847 in order to help staff and manage the schools. Upon her reception of the habit at exactly the same time as the founding - alongside Busquets and also with Felicia Clavell and Francisca de Domingo - she assumed the religious name of "Paula of Saint Joseph Calasanz". The group made their profession into the hands of the Archbishop of Barcelona Pedro Martínez de San Martín who also issued diocesan approval to her new order. The order received the papal decree of praise from Pope Pius IX later on 9 May 1860. The General Chapter on 14 March 1887 in Sabadell did not even see her elected as Superior General or in a leadership position; this allowed her to continue setting up her order across the nation.

The presence of the Piarist priests Jacinto Felíu and Agustín Casanovas proved to be to her benefit for their assistance allowed her to achieve the appropriate canonical structure of her order. The nun founded a total of seven schools in such cities as Figueras (1829) and Blanes (1854) as well as in Igualda (1849) and Masnou (1852). Her activism led the establishment of four others in places such as Sóller (1857). On 15 December 1859 she established a school in Barcelona and she would remain there for the remainder of her life.

Montal Fornés died in 1889 in Barcelona in the school she had set up there. In 2005 her order had 732 religious in 108 houses in countries such as Guinea-Bissau and Japan.

== Canonization ==
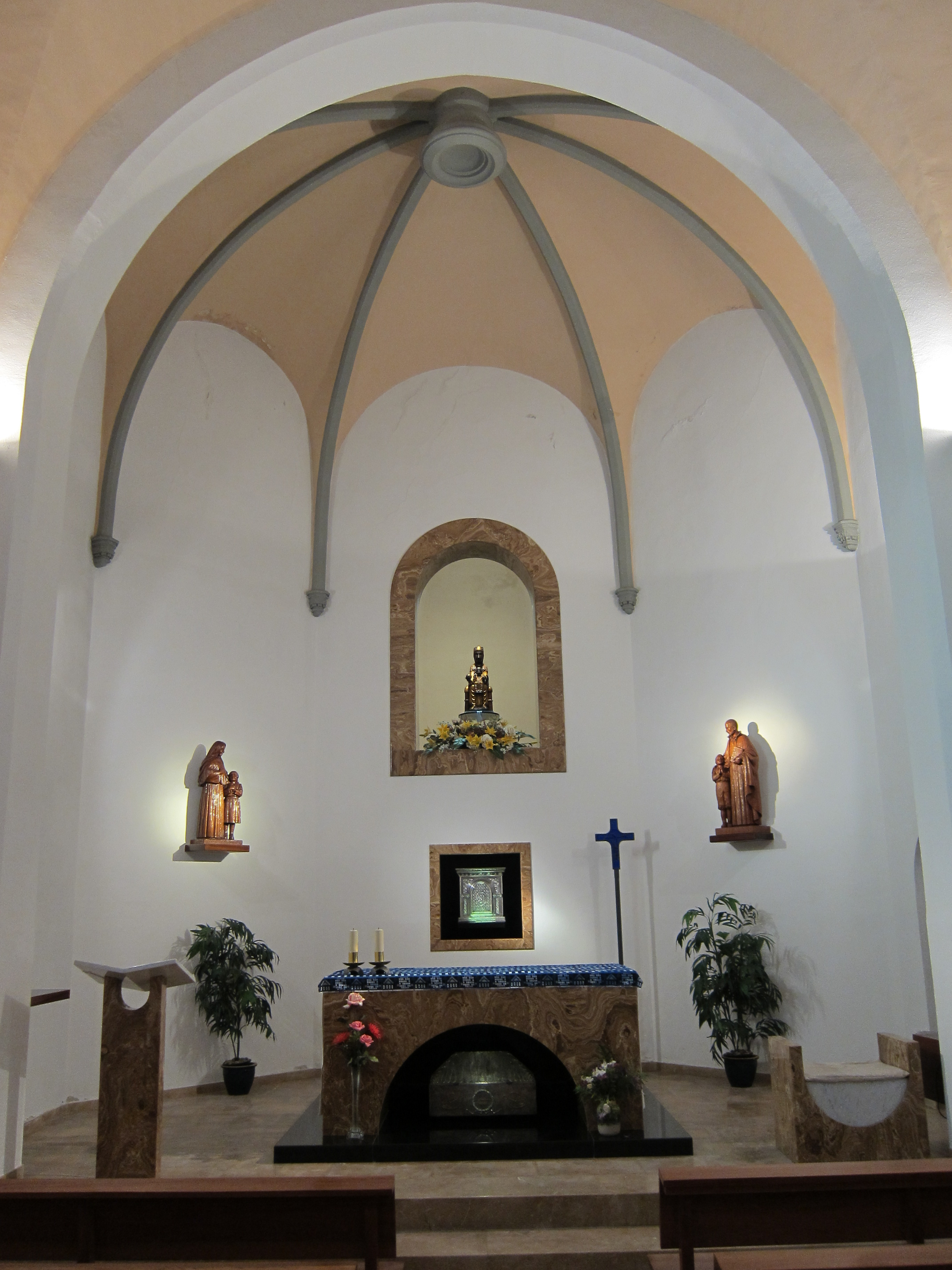
The chapel housing her remains

The sainthood process commenced under Pope Pius XII on 3 May 1957 in an informative process that saw the accumulation of all documentation in Barcelona that pertained to her life as well as witness testimonies. This process - which granted her the posthumous title of Servant of God - concluded all of its work on 12 June 1959. Theologians approved her writings on 5 July 1966 while historians approved the cause on 28 January 1986. The Positio - the dossier on her life and virtues - was submitted to the Congregation for the Causes of Saints in Rome in 1987 despite the fact that the diocesan process was not ratified until later on 25 June 1987. Theologians approved this cause on 24 May 1988 as did the C.C.S. on 15 November 1988. On 28 November 1988 she was proclaimed to be Venerable after Pope John Paul II recognized her life of heroic virtue.

The miracle required for her beatification was subject to a diocesan tribunal and received the decree of formal validation from the C.C.S. on 24 May 1991 in order for the miracle to be further evaluated in Rome. Medical experts approved it on 14 May 1992 as did theologians on 30 June 1992 and the C.C.S. later on 15 December 1992. John Paul II approved this case on 21 December 1992 and beatified her on 18 April 1993 in Saint Peter's Square.

The second miracle required for sainthood was also investigated and was said to have occurred in September 1993 (Blanquizal, Colombia) to a girl at the age of eight named Natalia García Mora (b. 1985). The process was validated in Rome on 19 January 1996 prior to the approval of the medical board sometime later on 8 July 1999. The consulting theologians likewise approved this on 16 November 1999 as did the C.C.S. on 4 April 2000. John Paul II approved this miracle on 1 July 2000 and formalized the date for the canonization at a consistory on 13 March 2001. He canonized her on 25 November 2001 in Saint Peter's Basilica.
