= Harringtonia myia =

Scientific classification
- Kingdom: Animalia
- Phylum: Arthropoda
- Class: Insecta
- Order: Coleoptera
- Suborder: Polyphaga
- Infraorder: Cucujiformia
- Family: Cerambycidae
- Genus: Harringtonia
- Species: H. myia

Binomial name
- Harringtonia myia (Dillon & Dillon, 1946)

Species of beetle

Harringtonia myia is a species of beetle in the family Cerambycidae. It was described by Dillon and Dillon in 1946. It is known from Bolivia.
