= Zenicomus photuroides =

Scientific classification
- Kingdom: Animalia
- Phylum: Arthropoda
- Class: Insecta
- Order: Coleoptera
- Suborder: Polyphaga
- Infraorder: Cucujiformia
- Family: Cerambycidae
- Genus: Zenicomus
- Species: Z. photuroides

Binomial name
- Zenicomus photuroides Thomson, 1868

Synonyms
- Hemilophus photuroides Gemminger & Harold, 1873

Species of beetle

Zenicomus photuroides is a species of beetle in the family Cerambycidae. It was described by Thomson in 1868. It is known from Brazil and Paraguay.
