= Graminea annulata =

Scientific classification
- Kingdom: Animalia
- Phylum: Arthropoda
- Class: Insecta
- Order: Coleoptera
- Suborder: Polyphaga
- Infraorder: Cucujiformia
- Family: Cerambycidae
- Genus: Graminea
- Species: G. annulata

Binomial name
- Graminea annulata Galileo & Martins, 1990

Species of beetle

Graminea annulata is a species of beetle in the family Cerambycidae. It was described by Galileo and Martins in 1990. It is known from Brazil.
