= Falsamblesthis gracilis =

Scientific classification
- Kingdom: Animalia
- Phylum: Arthropoda
- Class: Insecta
- Order: Coleoptera
- Suborder: Polyphaga
- Infraorder: Cucujiformia
- Family: Cerambycidae
- Genus: Falsamblesthis
- Species: F. gracilis

Binomial name
- Falsamblesthis gracilis (Lameere, 1893)

Species of beetle

Falsamblesthis gracilis is a species of beetle in the family Cerambycidae. It was described by Lameere in 1893. It is known from Venezuela.
