= Falsamblesthis candicans =

Scientific classification
- Kingdom: Animalia
- Phylum: Arthropoda
- Class: Insecta
- Order: Coleoptera
- Suborder: Polyphaga
- Infraorder: Cucujiformia
- Family: Cerambycidae
- Genus: Falsamblesthis
- Species: F. candicans

Binomial name
- Falsamblesthis candicans (Gounelle, 1910)

Species of beetle

Falsamblesthis candicans is a species of beetle in the family Cerambycidae. It was described by Gounelle in 1910. It is known from Ecuador.
