= Gryllica =

Scientific classification
- Kingdom: Animalia
- Phylum: Arthropoda
- Class: Insecta
- Order: Coleoptera
- Suborder: Polyphaga
- Infraorder: Cucujiformia
- Family: Cerambycidae
- Subfamily: Lamiinae
- Tribe: Calliini
- Genus: Gryllica; Thomson, 1860

Genus of beetles

Gryllica is a genus of longhorn beetles of the subfamily Lamiinae.

- Gryllica curitibana Lane, 1965
- Gryllica flavopustulata Thomson, 1860
- Gryllica picta (Pascoe, 1858)
- Gryllica prava Lane, 1973
- Gryllica pseudopicta Lane, 1965
- Gryllica pygmaea Lane, 1973
