= Falsamblesthis ibiyara =

Scientific classification
- Kingdom: Animalia
- Phylum: Arthropoda
- Class: Insecta
- Order: Coleoptera
- Suborder: Polyphaga
- Infraorder: Cucujiformia
- Family: Cerambycidae
- Genus: Falsamblesthis
- Species: F. ibiyara

Binomial name
- Falsamblesthis ibiyara Marinoni, 1978

Species of beetle

Falsamblesthis ibiyara is a species of beetle in the family Cerambycidae. It was described by Marinoni in 1978. It is known to be found in Brazil.
