= Falsamblesthis =

Scientific classification
- Kingdom: Animalia
- Phylum: Arthropoda
- Class: Insecta
- Order: Coleoptera
- Suborder: Polyphaga
- Infraorder: Cucujiformia
- Family: Cerambycidae
- Subfamily: Lamiinae
- Tribe: Forsteriini
- Genus: Falsamblesthis; Breuning, 1959

Genus of beetles

Falsamblesthis is a genus of longhorn beetles of the subfamily Lamiinae, containing the following species:

- Falsamblesthis candicans (Gounelle, 1910)
- Falsamblesthis gracilis (Lameere, 1893)
- Falsamblesthis ibiyara Marinoni, 1978
- Falsamblesthis macilenta (Gounelle, 1910)
- Falsamblesthis microps Martins & Galileo, 1992
- Falsamblesthis pilula Galileo & Martins, 1987
- Falsamblesthis seriepilosa (Kirsch, 1889)
- Falsamblesthis taeniata (Belon, 1903)
- Falsamblesthis unguicularis (Tippmann, 1960)
