= Gryllica curitibana =

Scientific classification
- Kingdom: Animalia
- Phylum: Arthropoda
- Class: Insecta
- Order: Coleoptera
- Suborder: Polyphaga
- Infraorder: Cucujiformia
- Family: Cerambycidae
- Genus: Gryllica
- Species: G. curitibana

Binomial name
- Gryllica curitibana Lane, 1965

Species of beetle

Gryllica curitibana is a species of beetle in the family Cerambycidae. It was described by Lane in 1965. It is known from Brazil.
