= Bactriola vittulata =

Scientific classification
- Kingdom: Animalia
- Phylum: Arthropoda
- Class: Insecta
- Order: Coleoptera
- Suborder: Polyphaga
- Infraorder: Cucujiformia
- Family: Cerambycidae
- Genus: Bactriola
- Species: B. vittulata

Binomial name
- Bactriola vittulata Bates, 1885

Species of beetle

Bactriola vittulata is a species of beetle in the family Cerambycidae. It was described by Bates in 1885. It is known from Brazil, Bolivia, French Guiana, Panama, Trinidad and Tobago, and Venezuela.
