= Udamina =

Scientific classification
- Kingdom: Animalia
- Phylum: Arthropoda
- Class: Insecta
- Order: Coleoptera
- Suborder: Polyphaga
- Infraorder: Cucujiformia
- Family: Cerambycidae
- Tribe: Forsteriini
- Genus: Udamina; Thomson, 1868
- Species: U. leprieurii

Binomial name
- Udamina leprieurii Thomson, 1868

Synonyms
- (Genus): Paraphaula Fuchs 1963; (Species): Paraphaula porosa Fuchs 1963

Genus of beetles

Udamina leprieurii is a species of beetle in the family Cerambycidae, and the only species in the genus Udamina. It was described by Thomson in 1868.
