= Eumimesis trilineata =

Scientific classification
- Domain: Eukaryota
- Kingdom: Animalia
- Phylum: Arthropoda
- Class: Insecta
- Order: Coleoptera
- Suborder: Polyphaga
- Infraorder: Cucujiformia
- Family: Cerambycidae
- Genus: Eumimesis
- Species: E. trilineata

Binomial name
- Eumimesis trilineata Magno & Monné, 1990

Species of beetle

Eumimesis trilineata is a species of beetle in the family Cerambycidae. It was described by Magno and Monné in 1990. It is known from Brazil.
