= Bactriola falsa =

Scientific classification
- Kingdom: Animalia
- Phylum: Arthropoda
- Clade: Pancrustacea
- Class: Insecta
- Order: Coleoptera
- Suborder: Polyphaga
- Infraorder: Cucujiformia
- Family: Cerambycidae
- Genus: Bactriola
- Species: B. falsa

Binomial name
- Bactriola falsa Martins & Galileo, 1992

Species of beetle

Bactriola falsa is a species of beetle in the family Cerambycidae. It was described by Martins and Galileo in 1992. It is known from Brazil (Bahia, Minas Gerais, Espírito Santo, Rio de Janeiro, São Paulo, Paraná, Santa Catarina, Rio Grande do Sul) and Paraguay.
