= Falsamblesthis seriepilosa =

Scientific classification
- Kingdom: Animalia
- Phylum: Arthropoda
- Class: Insecta
- Order: Coleoptera
- Suborder: Polyphaga
- Infraorder: Cucujiformia
- Family: Cerambycidae
- Genus: Falsamblesthis
- Species: F. seriepilosa

Binomial name
- Falsamblesthis seriepilosa (Kirsch, 1889)

Species of beetle

Falsamblesthis seriepilosa is a species of beetle in the family Cerambycidae. It was described by Theodor Franz Wilhelm Kirsch in 1889. It is known from Ecuador.
