= Obereoides setulosus =

Scientific classification
- Kingdom: Animalia
- Phylum: Arthropoda
- Class: Insecta
- Order: Coleoptera
- Suborder: Polyphaga
- Infraorder: Cucujiformia
- Family: Cerambycidae
- Genus: Obereoides
- Species: O. setulosus

Binomial name
- Obereoides setulosus (Aurivillius, 1920)

Species of beetle

Obereoides setulosus is a species of beetle in the family Cerambycidae. It was described by Per Olof Christopher Aurivillius in 1920 and is known from Brazil.
