= Amucallia hovorei =

Scientific classification
- Kingdom: Animalia
- Phylum: Arthropoda
- Class: Insecta
- Order: Coleoptera
- Suborder: Polyphaga
- Infraorder: Cucujiformia
- Family: Cerambycidae
- Genus: Amucallia
- Species: A. hovorei

Binomial name
- Amucallia hovorei Galileo & Martins, 2008

Species of beetle

Amucallia hovorei is a species of beetle in the family Cerambycidae. It was described by Galileo and Martins in 2008. It is known from Panama.
