= Asemolea purpuricollis =

Scientific classification
- Domain: Eukaryota
- Kingdom: Animalia
- Phylum: Arthropoda
- Class: Insecta
- Order: Coleoptera
- Suborder: Polyphaga
- Infraorder: Cucujiformia
- Family: Cerambycidae
- Genus: Asemolea
- Species: A. purpuricollis

Binomial name
- Asemolea purpuricollis Bates, 1885

Species of beetle

Asemolea purpuricollis is a species of beetle in the family Cerambycidae. It was described by Bates in 1885. It is known from Panama.
