= Saepiseuthes =

Scientific classification
- Kingdom: Animalia
- Phylum: Arthropoda
- Class: Insecta
- Order: Coleoptera
- Suborder: Polyphaga
- Infraorder: Cucujiformia
- Family: Cerambycidae
- Tribe: Forsteriini
- Genus: Saepiseuthes

Genus of beetles

Saepiseuthes is a genus of longhorn beetles of the subfamily Lamiinae, containing the following species:

- Saepiseuthes chilensis Thomson, 1868
- Saepiseuthes obliquatus (Fairmaire & Germain, 1859)
