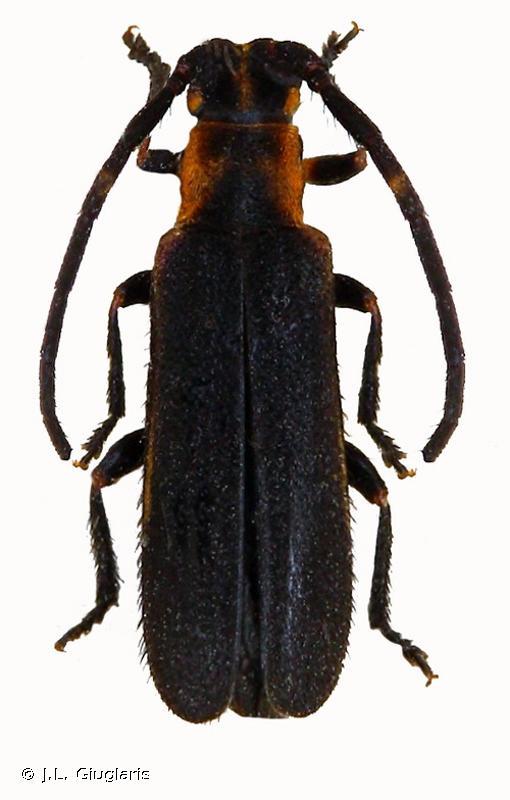

Conservation status
- Least Concern (IUCN 3.1)

Scientific classification
- Kingdom: Animalia
- Phylum: Arthropoda
- Class: Insecta
- Order: Coleoptera
- Suborder: Polyphaga
- Infraorder: Cucujiformia
- Family: Cerambycidae
- Genus: Mimolaia
- Species: M. cleroides

Binomial name
- Mimolaia cleroides Bates, 1866

= Mimolaia cleroides =

Species of beetle

Mimolaia cleroides is a species of beetle in the family Cerambycidae. It was described by Bates in 1866. It is known from Brazil.
