= Falsamblesthis taeniata =

Scientific classification
- Kingdom: Animalia
- Phylum: Arthropoda
- Class: Insecta
- Order: Coleoptera
- Suborder: Polyphaga
- Infraorder: Cucujiformia
- Family: Cerambycidae
- Genus: Falsamblesthis
- Species: F. taeniata

Binomial name
- Falsamblesthis taeniata (Belon, 1903)

Species of beetle

Falsamblesthis taeniata is a species of beetle in the family Cerambycidae. It was described by Belon in 1903. It is known from Bolivia.
