= Gryllica picta =

Scientific classification
- Kingdom: Animalia
- Phylum: Arthropoda
- Class: Insecta
- Order: Coleoptera
- Suborder: Polyphaga
- Infraorder: Cucujiformia
- Family: Cerambycidae
- Genus: Gryllica
- Species: G. picta

Binomial name
- Gryllica picta (Pascoe, 1858)

Species of beetle

Gryllica picta is a species of beetle in the family Cerambycidae. It was described by Pascoe in 1858. It is known from Argentina and Brazil.
