= Falsamblesthis unguicularis =

Scientific classification
- Kingdom: Animalia
- Phylum: Arthropoda
- Class: Insecta
- Order: Coleoptera
- Suborder: Polyphaga
- Infraorder: Cucujiformia
- Family: Cerambycidae
- Genus: Falsamblesthis
- Species: F. unguicularis

Binomial name
- Falsamblesthis unguicularis (Tippmann, 1960)

Species of beetle

Falsamblesthis unguicularis is a species of beetle in the family Cerambycidae. It was described by Tippmann in 1960. It is known from Bolivia.
