= Canindea maculata =

Scientific classification
- Kingdom: Animalia
- Phylum: Arthropoda
- Class: Insecta
- Order: Coleoptera
- Suborder: Polyphaga
- Infraorder: Cucujiformia
- Family: Cerambycidae
- Genus: Canindea
- Species: C. maculata

Binomial name
- Canindea maculata Galileo & Martins, 1990

Species of beetle

Canindea maculata is a species of beetle in the family Cerambycidae. It was described by Galileo and Martins in 1990. It is known from Brazil.
