= Nyctonympha annulata =

Scientific classification
- Kingdom: Animalia
- Phylum: Arthropoda
- Class: Insecta
- Order: Coleoptera
- Suborder: Polyphaga
- Infraorder: Cucujiformia
- Family: Cerambycidae
- Genus: Nyctonympha
- Species: N. annulata

Binomial name
- Nyctonympha annulata Aurivillius, 1900

Species of beetle

Nyctonympha annulata is a species of beetle in the family Cerambycidae. It was described by Per Olof Christopher Aurivillius in 1900. It is known from Panama and Venezuela.
