= Nyctonympha =

Scientific classification
- Kingdom: Animalia
- Phylum: Arthropoda
- Class: Insecta
- Order: Coleoptera
- Suborder: Polyphaga
- Infraorder: Cucujiformia
- Family: Cerambycidae
- Subfamily: Lamiinae
- Tribe: Forsteriini
- Genus: Nyctonympha; Thomson, 1868

Genus of beetles

Nyctonympha is a genus of longhorn beetles of the subfamily Lamiinae, containing the following species:

- Nyctonympha affinis Martins & Galileo, 2008
- Nyctonympha andersoni Martins & Galileo, 1992
- Nyctonympha annulata Aurivillius, 1900
- Nyctonympha annulipes (Belon, 1897)
- Nyctonympha boyacana Galileo & Martins, 2008
- Nyctonympha carcharias (Lameere, 1893)
- Nyctonympha carioca Galileo & Martins, 2001
- Nyctonympha costipennis (Lameere, 1893)
- Nyctonympha cribrata Thomson, 1868
- Nyctonympha flavipes Aurivillius, 1920
- Nyctonympha genieri Martins & Galileo, 1992
- Nyctonympha howdenarum Martins & Galileo, 1992
- Nyctonympha punctata Martins & Galileo, 1989
- Nyctonympha taeniata Martins & Galileo, 1992
