= Hemicladus buqueti =

Scientific classification
- Domain: Eukaryota
- Kingdom: Animalia
- Phylum: Arthropoda
- Class: Insecta
- Order: Coleoptera
- Suborder: Polyphaga
- Infraorder: Cucujiformia
- Family: Cerambycidae
- Genus: Hemicladus
- Species: H. buqueti

Binomial name
- Hemicladus buqueti Tavakilian, Touroult & Dalens, 2010

Species of beetle

Hemicladus buqueti is a species of beetle in the family Cerambycidae. It was described by Tavakilian, Touroult and Dalens in 2010. It is known from Guyana.
