= Anapsicomus =

Scientific classification
- Kingdom: Animalia
- Phylum: Arthropoda
- Class: Insecta
- Order: Coleoptera
- Suborder: Polyphaga
- Infraorder: Cucujiformia
- Family: Cerambycidae
- Tribe: Calliini
- Genus: Anapsicomus

Genus of beetles

Anapsicomus is a genus of longhorn beetles of the subfamily Lamiinae.

- Anapsicomus aethroides Galileo & Martins, 1988
- Anapsicomus lampyroides (Bates, 1866)
