= Canindea latithorax =

Scientific classification
- Kingdom: Animalia
- Phylum: Arthropoda
- Class: Insecta
- Order: Coleoptera
- Suborder: Polyphaga
- Infraorder: Cucujiformia
- Family: Cerambycidae
- Genus: Canindea
- Species: C. latithorax

Binomial name
- Canindea latithorax Galileo & Martins, 1991

Species of beetle

Canindea latithorax is a species of beetle in the family Cerambycidae. It was described by Galileo and Martins in 1991. It is known from Brazil.
