= Bactriola =

Scientific classification
- Kingdom: Animalia
- Phylum: Arthropoda
- Class: Insecta
- Order: Coleoptera
- Suborder: Polyphaga
- Infraorder: Cucujiformia
- Family: Cerambycidae
- Subfamily: Lamiinae
- Tribe: Forsteriini
- Genus: Bactriola; Bates, 1885

Genus of beetles

Bactriola is a genus of longhorn beetles of the subfamily Lamiinae, containing the following species:

- Bactriola achira Galileo & Martins, 2008
- Bactriola antennata Galileo & Martins, 2008
- Bactriola circumdata Martins & Galileo, 1992
- Bactriola falsa Martins & Galileo, 1992
- Bactriola maculata Martins & Galileo, 1992
- Bactriola minuscula Fontes & Martins, 1977
- Bactriola paupercula Bates, 1885
- Bactriola vittulata Bates, 1885
