= Harringtonia =

Scientific classification
- Kingdom: Animalia
- Phylum: Arthropoda
- Class: Insecta
- Order: Coleoptera
- Suborder: Polyphaga
- Infraorder: Cucujiformia
- Family: Cerambycidae
- Tribe: Calliini
- Genus: Harringtonia; Dillon & Dillon, 1946

Genus of beetles

Harringtonia is a genus of longhorn beetles of the subfamily Lamiinae.

- Harringtonia dalmeidai (Dillon & Dillon, 1946)
- Harringtonia myia (Dillon & Dillon, 1946)
