= Mimolaia diversicornis =

Scientific classification
- Kingdom: Animalia
- Phylum: Arthropoda
- Class: Insecta
- Order: Coleoptera
- Suborder: Polyphaga
- Infraorder: Cucujiformia
- Family: Cerambycidae
- Genus: Mimolaia
- Species: M. diversicornis

Binomial name
- Mimolaia diversicornis Galileo & Martins, 2010

Species of beetle

Mimolaia diversicornis is a species of longhorn beetle (family Cerambycidae) from Bolívar, Venezuela. It was described in 2010 by Maria Helena M. Galileo and Ubirajara R. Martins.
