= Hemicladus =

Scientific classification
- Domain: Eukaryota
- Kingdom: Animalia
- Phylum: Arthropoda
- Class: Insecta
- Order: Coleoptera
- Suborder: Polyphaga
- Infraorder: Cucujiformia
- Family: Cerambycidae
- Tribe: Calliini
- Genus: Hemicladus

Genus of beetles

Hemicladus is a genus of longhorn beetles of the subfamily Lamiinae.

- Hemicladus buqueti Tavakilian, Touroult & Dalens, 2010
- Hemicladus callipus Buquet, 1857
- Hemicladus decoratus Fuchs, 1955
- Hemicladus dejeanii Buquet, 1857
- Hemicladus fasciatus Galileo & Martins, 1991
- Hemicladus thomsonii Buquet, 1857
