= Nyctonympha taeniata =

Scientific classification
- Kingdom: Animalia
- Phylum: Arthropoda
- Class: Insecta
- Order: Coleoptera
- Suborder: Polyphaga
- Infraorder: Cucujiformia
- Family: Cerambycidae
- Genus: Nyctonympha
- Species: N. taeniata

Binomial name
- Nyctonympha taeniata Martins & Galileo, 1992

Species of beetle

Nyctonympha taeniata is a species of beetle in the family Cerambycidae. It was described by Martins and Galileo in 1992. It is known from Panama and Trinidad and Tobago.
