= Eumathes cuprascens =

Scientific classification
- Kingdom: Animalia
- Phylum: Arthropoda
- Class: Insecta
- Order: Coleoptera
- Suborder: Polyphaga
- Infraorder: Cucujiformia
- Family: Cerambycidae
- Genus: Eumathes
- Species: E. cuprascens

Binomial name
- Eumathes cuprascens Bates, 1874

Species of beetle

Eumathes cuprascens is a species of beetle in the family Cerambycidae. It was described by Bates in 1874. It is known from Nicaragua and Panama.
