= Mimolaia =

Scientific classification
- Domain: Eukaryota
- Kingdom: Animalia
- Phylum: Arthropoda
- Class: Insecta
- Order: Coleoptera
- Suborder: Polyphaga
- Infraorder: Cucujiformia
- Family: Cerambycidae
- Tribe: Calliini
- Genus: Mimolaia

Genus of beetles

Mimolaia is a genus of longhorn beetles of the subfamily Lamiinae.

- Mimolaia acaiuba Galileo & Martins, 1998
- Mimolaia annulata Galileo & Martins, 2010
- Mimolaia buckleyi (Bates, 1885)
- Mimolaia calopterona (Bates, 1885)
- Mimolaia cleroides (Bates, 1866)
- Mimolaia diversicornis Galileo & Martins, 2010
- Mimolaia hua Galileo & Martins, 1991
- Mimolaia lata Galileo & Martins, 1991
- Mimolaia peruana Galileo & Martins, 1991
- Mimolaia pichincha Galileo & Martins, 1992
- Mimolaia tachira Galileo & Martins, 1992
- Mimolaia variicornis Belon, 1903
