= Gryllica flavopustulata =

Scientific classification
- Kingdom: Animalia
- Phylum: Arthropoda
- Class: Insecta
- Order: Coleoptera
- Suborder: Polyphaga
- Infraorder: Cucujiformia
- Family: Cerambycidae
- Genus: Gryllica
- Species: G. flavopustulata

Binomial name
- Gryllica flavopustulata Thomson, 1860

Species of beetle

Gryllica flavopustulata is a species of beetle in the family Cerambycidae. It was described by Thomson in 1860. It is known from Brazil.
