= Hemicladus callipus =

Scientific classification
- Domain: Eukaryota
- Kingdom: Animalia
- Phylum: Arthropoda
- Class: Insecta
- Order: Coleoptera
- Suborder: Polyphaga
- Infraorder: Cucujiformia
- Family: Cerambycidae
- Genus: Hemicladus
- Species: H. callipus

Binomial name
- Hemicladus callipus Buquet, 1857

Species of beetle

Hemicladus callipus is a species of beetle in the family Cerambycidae. It was described by Buquet in 1857. It is known from Brazil.
