= Gryllica prava =

Scientific classification
- Kingdom: Animalia
- Phylum: Arthropoda
- Class: Insecta
- Order: Coleoptera
- Suborder: Polyphaga
- Infraorder: Cucujiformia
- Family: Cerambycidae
- Genus: Gryllica
- Species: G. prava

Binomial name
- Gryllica prava Lane, 1973

Synonyms
- Gryllica parva Lane, 1973

Species of beetle

Gryllica prava is a species of beetle in the family Cerambycidae. It was described by Lane in 1973. It is known from Brazil.
