= Callisema elongata =

Scientific classification
- Kingdom: Animalia
- Phylum: Arthropoda
- Class: Insecta
- Order: Coleoptera
- Suborder: Polyphaga
- Infraorder: Cucujiformia
- Family: Cerambycidae
- Genus: Callisema
- Species: C. elongata

Binomial name
- Callisema elongata Galileo & Martins, 1992

Species of beetle

Callisema elongata is a species of beetle in the family Cerambycidae. It was described by Galileo and Martins in 1992. It is known from Colombia and Venezuela.
