= Zenicomus ignicolor =

Scientific classification
- Kingdom: Animalia
- Phylum: Arthropoda
- Class: Insecta
- Order: Coleoptera
- Suborder: Polyphaga
- Infraorder: Cucujiformia
- Family: Cerambycidae
- Genus: Zenicomus
- Species: Z. ignicolor

Binomial name
- Zenicomus ignicolor Galileo & Martins, 1988

Species of beetle

Zenicomus ignicolor is a species of beetle in the family Cerambycidae. It was described by Galileo and Martins in 1988. It is known from Brazil.
