= Nyctonympha annulipes =

Scientific classification
- Kingdom: Animalia
- Phylum: Arthropoda
- Class: Insecta
- Order: Coleoptera
- Suborder: Polyphaga
- Infraorder: Cucujiformia
- Family: Cerambycidae
- Genus: Nyctonympha
- Species: N. annulipes

Binomial name
- Nyctonympha annulipes (Belon, 1897)

Species of beetle

Nyctonympha annulipes is a species of beetle in the family Cerambycidae. It was described by Belon in 1897. It is known from Bolivia and Peru.
