= Eumathes canus =

Scientific classification
- Kingdom: Animalia
- Phylum: Arthropoda
- Clade: Pancrustacea
- Class: Insecta
- Order: Coleoptera
- Suborder: Polyphaga
- Infraorder: Cucujiformia
- Family: Cerambycidae
- Genus: Eumathes
- Species: E. canus

Binomial name
- Eumathes canus (Germar, 1824)

Species of beetle

Eumathes canus is a species of beetle in the family Cerambycidae. It was described by Ernst Friedrich Germar in 1824. It is known from Brazil (Bahia, Minas Gerais, Espírito Santo, Rio de Janeiro, Paraná) and Paraguay (Guairá).
