= Nyctonympha carioca =

Scientific classification
- Kingdom: Animalia
- Phylum: Arthropoda
- Class: Insecta
- Order: Coleoptera
- Suborder: Polyphaga
- Infraorder: Cucujiformia
- Family: Cerambycidae
- Genus: Nyctonympha
- Species: N. carioca

Binomial name
- Nyctonympha carioca Galileo & Martins, 2001

Species of beetle

Nyctonympha carioca is a species of beetle in the family Cerambycidae. It was described by Galileo and Martins in 2001. It is known from Brazil.
