= Gryllica pygmaea =

Scientific classification
- Kingdom: Animalia
- Phylum: Arthropoda
- Class: Insecta
- Order: Coleoptera
- Suborder: Polyphaga
- Infraorder: Cucujiformia
- Family: Cerambycidae
- Genus: Gryllica
- Species: G. pygmaea

Binomial name
- Gryllica pygmaea Lane, 1973

Species of beetle

Gryllica pygmaea is a species of beetle in the family Cerambycidae. It was described by Lane in 1973. It is known from Brazil.
