= Obereoides antennatus =

Scientific classification
- Kingdom: Animalia
- Phylum: Arthropoda
- Class: Insecta
- Order: Coleoptera
- Suborder: Polyphaga
- Infraorder: Cucujiformia
- Family: Cerambycidae
- Genus: Obereoides
- Species: O. antennatus

Binomial name
- Obereoides antennatus Martins & Galileo, 2003

Species of beetle

Obereoides antennatus is a species of beetle in the family Cerambycidae. It was described by Martins and Galileo in 2003. It is known from Bolivia.
