= Asemolea minuta =

Scientific classification
- Kingdom: Animalia
- Phylum: Arthropoda
- Class: Insecta
- Order: Coleoptera
- Suborder: Polyphaga
- Infraorder: Cucujiformia
- Family: Cerambycidae
- Genus: Asemolea
- Species: A. minuta

Binomial name
- Asemolea minuta (Bates, 1872)

Synonyms
- Callia minuta Bates, 1872

Species of beetle

Asemolea minuta is a species of beetle in the family Cerambycidae. It was described by Bates in 1872. It is known from Honduras, Guatemala, Nicaragua and Costa Rica.
