= Nyctonympha carcharias =

Scientific classification
- Kingdom: Animalia
- Phylum: Arthropoda
- Class: Insecta
- Order: Coleoptera
- Suborder: Polyphaga
- Infraorder: Cucujiformia
- Family: Cerambycidae
- Genus: Nyctonympha
- Species: N. carcharias

Binomial name
- Nyctonympha carcharias (Lameere, 1893)

Synonyms
- Hebestola carcharias Lameere, 1893; Nyctonympha glauca Aurivillius, 1900

Species of beetle

Nyctonympha carcharias is a species of beetle in the family Cerambycidae. It was described by Lameere in 1893, originally under the genus Hebestola. It is known from Venezuela.
