= Ardeocomus =

Scientific classification
- Kingdom: Animalia
- Phylum: Arthropoda
- Class: Insecta
- Order: Coleoptera
- Suborder: Polyphaga
- Infraorder: Cucujiformia
- Family: Cerambycidae
- Subfamily: Lamiinae
- Tribe: Calliini
- Genus: Ardeocomus; Galileo & Martins, 1988
- Species: A. hemilophoides

Binomial name
- Ardeocomus hemilophoides Galileo & Martins, 1988

Genus of beetles

Ardeocomus hemilophoides is a species of beetle in the family Cerambycidae, and the only species in the genus Ardeocomus. It was described by Galileo and Martins in 1988.
