= Canindea signaticornis =

Scientific classification
- Kingdom: Animalia
- Phylum: Arthropoda
- Class: Insecta
- Order: Coleoptera
- Suborder: Polyphaga
- Infraorder: Cucujiformia
- Family: Cerambycidae
- Genus: Canindea
- Species: C. signaticornis

Binomial name
- Canindea signaticornis (Buquet, 1857)

Synonyms
- Hastatis signaticornis Buquet, 1857

Species of beetle

Canindea signaticornis is a species of beetle in the family Cerambycidae. It was described by Buquet in 1857. It is known from Brazil and French Guiana.
