= Eumathes =

Scientific classification
- Kingdom: Animalia
- Phylum: Arthropoda
- Class: Insecta
- Order: Coleoptera
- Suborder: Polyphaga
- Infraorder: Cucujiformia
- Family: Cerambycidae
- Subfamily: Lamiinae
- Tribe: Calliini
- Genus: Eumathes; Pascoe, 1858

Genus of beetles

Eumathes is a genus of longhorn beetles of the subfamily Lamiinae.

- Eumathes amazonicus Bates, 1866
- Eumathes canus (Germar, 1824)
- Eumathes colombicus (Thomson, 1868)
- Eumathes cuprascens Bates, 1874
