= Eumathes amazonicus =

Scientific classification
- Kingdom: Animalia
- Phylum: Arthropoda
- Class: Insecta
- Order: Coleoptera
- Suborder: Polyphaga
- Infraorder: Cucujiformia
- Family: Cerambycidae
- Genus: Eumathes
- Species: E. amazonicus

Binomial name
- Eumathes amazonicus Bates, 1866

Species of beetle

Eumathes amazonicus is a species of beetle in the family Cerambycidae. It was described by Henry Walter Bates in 1866. It is known from Brazil.
