= Graminea inca =

Scientific classification
- Kingdom: Animalia
- Phylum: Arthropoda
- Class: Insecta
- Order: Coleoptera
- Suborder: Polyphaga
- Infraorder: Cucujiformia
- Family: Cerambycidae
- Genus: Graminea
- Species: G. inca

Binomial name
- Graminea inca Galileo & Martins, 1990

Species of beetle

Graminea inca is a species of beetle in the family Cerambycidae. It was described by Galileo and Martins in 1990. It is known from Peru.
