= Obereoides =

Scientific classification
- Kingdom: Animalia
- Phylum: Arthropoda
- Class: Insecta
- Order: Coleoptera
- Suborder: Polyphaga
- Infraorder: Cucujiformia
- Family: Cerambycidae
- Subfamily: Lamiinae
- Tribe: Forsteriini
- Genus: Obereoides; Fisher, 1938

Genus of beetles

Obereoides is a genus of longhorn beetles of the subfamily Lamiinae, containing the following species:

- Obereoides antennatus Martins & Galileo, 2003
- Obereoides cicatricosus (Zajciw, 1968)
- Obereoides joergenseni (Bruch, 1911)
- Obereoides parahybanus Galileo & Martins, 1998
- Obereoides setulosus (Aurivillius, 1920)
