= Obereoides cicatricosus =

Scientific classification
- Kingdom: Animalia
- Phylum: Arthropoda
- Class: Insecta
- Order: Coleoptera
- Suborder: Polyphaga
- Infraorder: Cucujiformia
- Family: Cerambycidae
- Genus: Obereoides
- Species: O. cicatricosus

Binomial name
- Obereoides cicatricosus (Zajciw, 1968)

Synonyms
- Obereoides cicatricosa (Zajciw, 1968)

Species of beetle

Obereoides cicatricosus is a species of beetle in the family Cerambycidae. It was described by Dmytro Zajciw in 1968. It is known from Brazil.
