= Callisema =

Scientific classification
- Kingdom: Animalia
- Phylum: Arthropoda
- Class: Insecta
- Order: Coleoptera
- Suborder: Polyphaga
- Infraorder: Cucujiformia
- Family: Cerambycidae
- Subfamily: Lamiinae
- Tribe: Calliini
- Genus: Callisema; Martins & Galileo, 1990

Genus of beetles

Callisema is a genus of longhorn beetles of the subfamily Lamiinae.

- Callisema consortium Martins & Galileo, 1990
- Callisema elongata Galileo & Martins, 1992
- Callisema iucaua Martins & Galileo, 1996
- Callisema rufipes Martins & Galileo, 1990
- Callisema socium Martins & Galileo, 1990
