= Hastatis femoralis =

Scientific classification
- Kingdom: Animalia
- Phylum: Arthropoda
- Class: Insecta
- Order: Coleoptera
- Suborder: Polyphaga
- Infraorder: Cucujiformia
- Family: Cerambycidae
- Genus: Hastatis
- Species: H. femoralis

Binomial name
- Hastatis femoralis Burmeister, 1865

Species of beetle

Hastatis femoralis is a species of beetle in the family Cerambycidae. It was described by Hermann Burmeister in 1865. It is known from Argentina.
