= Euryestola castanea =

Scientific classification
- Kingdom: Animalia
- Phylum: Arthropoda
- Class: Insecta
- Order: Coleoptera
- Suborder: Polyphaga
- Infraorder: Cucujiformia
- Family: Cerambycidae
- Genus: Euryestola
- Species: E. castanea

Binomial name
- Euryestola castanea Galileo & Martins, 2001

Species of beetle

Euryestola castanea is a species of beetle in the family Cerambycidae. It was described by Galileo and Martins in 2001. It is known from Brazil.
