= Hemicladus fasciatus =

Scientific classification
- Domain: Eukaryota
- Kingdom: Animalia
- Phylum: Arthropoda
- Class: Insecta
- Order: Coleoptera
- Suborder: Polyphaga
- Infraorder: Cucujiformia
- Family: Cerambycidae
- Genus: Hemicladus
- Species: H. fasciatus

Binomial name
- Hemicladus fasciatus Galileo & Martins, 1991

Species of beetle

Hemicladus fasciatus is a species of beetle in the family Cerambycidae. It was described by Galileo and Martins in 1991. It is known from Ecuador and Brazil.
