= Obereoides joergenseni =

Scientific classification
- Kingdom: Animalia
- Phylum: Arthropoda
- Class: Insecta
- Order: Coleoptera
- Suborder: Polyphaga
- Infraorder: Cucujiformia
- Family: Cerambycidae
- Genus: Obereoides
- Species: O. joergenseni

Binomial name
- Obereoides joergenseni (Bruch, 1911)

Synonyms
- Hebestola joergenseni Bruch, 1911; Nyctonympha rufipes Aurivillius, 1920; Obereoides tenuis Fisher, 1938

Species of beetle

Obereoides joergenseni is a species of beetle in the family Cerambycidae. It was described by Bruch in 1911. It is known from Brazil and Paraguay.
