= Colombicallia =

Scientific classification
- Kingdom: Animalia
- Phylum: Arthropoda
- Class: Insecta
- Order: Coleoptera
- Suborder: Polyphaga
- Infraorder: Cucujiformia
- Family: Cerambycidae
- Tribe: Calliini
- Genus: Colombicallia

Genus of beetles

Colombicallia is a genus of longhorn beetles of the subfamily Lamiinae.

- Colombicallia albofasciata Martins & Galileo, 2006
- Colombicallia curta Galileo & Martins, 1992
