= Mimolaia variicornis =

Scientific classification
- Domain: Eukaryota
- Kingdom: Animalia
- Phylum: Arthropoda
- Class: Insecta
- Order: Coleoptera
- Suborder: Polyphaga
- Infraorder: Cucujiformia
- Family: Cerambycidae
- Genus: Mimolaia
- Species: M. variicornis

Binomial name
- Mimolaia variicornis Belon, 1903

Species of beetle

Mimolaia variicornis is a species of beetle in the family Cerambycidae. It was described by Belon in 1903. It is known from Bolivia.
