= Bactriola minuscula =

Scientific classification
- Kingdom: Animalia
- Phylum: Arthropoda
- Class: Insecta
- Order: Coleoptera
- Suborder: Polyphaga
- Infraorder: Cucujiformia
- Family: Cerambycidae
- Genus: Bactriola
- Species: B. minuscula

Binomial name
- Bactriola minuscula Fontes & Martins, 1977

Species of beetle

Bactriola minuscula is a species of beetle in the family Cerambycidae. It was described by Fontes and Martins in 1977. It is known from Brazil.
