= Amucallia colombiana =

Scientific classification
- Kingdom: Animalia
- Phylum: Arthropoda
- Class: Insecta
- Order: Coleoptera
- Suborder: Polyphaga
- Infraorder: Cucujiformia
- Family: Cerambycidae
- Genus: Amucallia
- Species: A. colombiana

Binomial name
- Amucallia colombiana Galileo & Martins, 2010

Species of beetle

Amucallia colombiana is a species of beetle in the family Cerambycidae. It was described by Galileo and Martins in 2010. It is known from Colombia.
