= Zenicomus =

Scientific classification
- Kingdom: Animalia
- Phylum: Arthropoda
- Class: Insecta
- Order: Coleoptera
- Suborder: Polyphaga
- Infraorder: Cucujiformia
- Family: Cerambycidae
- Tribe: Calliini
- Genus: Zenicomus

Genus of beetles

Zenicomus is a genus of longhorn beetles of the subfamily Lamiinae.

- Zenicomus ignicolor Galileo & Martins, 1988
- Zenicomus photuroides Thomson, 1868
