= Callisema iucaua =

Scientific classification
- Kingdom: Animalia
- Phylum: Arthropoda
- Class: Insecta
- Order: Coleoptera
- Suborder: Polyphaga
- Infraorder: Cucujiformia
- Family: Cerambycidae
- Genus: Callisema
- Species: C. iucaua

Binomial name
- Callisema iucaua Martins & Galileo, 1996

Species of beetle

Callisema iucaua is a species of beetle in the family Cerambycidae. It was described by Martins and Galileo in 1996. It is known from Peru.
