= Amucallia =

Scientific classification
- Kingdom: Animalia
- Phylum: Arthropoda
- Class: Insecta
- Order: Coleoptera
- Suborder: Polyphaga
- Infraorder: Cucujiformia
- Family: Cerambycidae
- Subfamily: Lamiinae
- Tribe: Calliini
- Genus: Amucallia; Galileo & Martins, 2008

Genus of beetles

Amucallia is a genus of longhorn beetles of the subfamily Lamiinae.

- Amucallia colombiana Galileo & Martins, 2010
- Amucallia hovorei Galileo & Martins, 2008
- Amucallia miranda Galileo & Martins, 2010
- Amucallia venezuelensis Galileo & Martins, 2010
