= Mimolaia peruana =

Scientific classification
- Domain: Eukaryota
- Kingdom: Animalia
- Phylum: Arthropoda
- Class: Insecta
- Order: Coleoptera
- Suborder: Polyphaga
- Infraorder: Cucujiformia
- Family: Cerambycidae
- Genus: Mimolaia
- Species: M. peruana

Binomial name
- Mimolaia peruana Galileo & Martins, 1991

Species of beetle

Mimolaia peruana is a species of beetle in the family Cerambycidae. It was described by Galileo and Martins in 1991. It is known from Peru.
