= Nyctonympha cribrata =

Scientific classification
- Kingdom: Animalia
- Phylum: Arthropoda
- Class: Insecta
- Order: Coleoptera
- Suborder: Polyphaga
- Infraorder: Cucujiformia
- Family: Cerambycidae
- Genus: Nyctonympha
- Species: N. cribrata

Binomial name
- Nyctonympha cribrata Thomson, 1868

Species of beetle

Nyctonympha cribrata is a species of beetle in the family Cerambycidae. It was described by Thomson in 1868. It is known from Colombia.
