= Graminea hispida =

Scientific classification
- Kingdom: Animalia
- Phylum: Arthropoda
- Clade: Pancrustacea
- Class: Insecta
- Order: Coleoptera
- Suborder: Polyphaga
- Infraorder: Cucujiformia
- Family: Cerambycidae
- Genus: Graminea
- Species: G. hispida

Binomial name
- Graminea hispida Galileo & Martins, 1990

Species of beetle

Graminea hispida is a species of beetle in the family Cerambycidae. It was described by Galileo and Martins in 1990. It is known from Brazil (Rondônia, Maranhão, Paraná, Goiás) and Bolivia (Santa Cruz).
