= Euryestola =

Scientific classification
- Kingdom: Animalia
- Phylum: Arthropoda
- Class: Insecta
- Order: Coleoptera
- Suborder: Polyphaga
- Infraorder: Cucujiformia
- Family: Cerambycidae
- Subfamily: Lamiinae
- Tribe: Calliini
- Genus: Euryestola; Breuning, 1940

Genus of beetles

Euryestola is a genus of longhorn beetles of the subfamily Lamiinae.

- Euryestola antennalis Breuning, 1940
- Euryestola caraca Galileo & Martins, 1997
- Euryestola castanea Galileo & Martins, 2001
- Euryestola freyi Breuning, 1955
- Euryestola iquira Galileo & Martins, 1997
- Euryestola morotinga Galileo & Martins, 1997
- Euryestola murupe Galileo & Martins, 1997
