= Piampatara ubirajarai =

Scientific classification
- Domain: Eukaryota
- Kingdom: Animalia
- Phylum: Arthropoda
- Class: Insecta
- Order: Coleoptera
- Suborder: Polyphaga
- Infraorder: Cucujiformia
- Family: Cerambycidae
- Genus: Piampatara
- Species: P. ubirajarai

Binomial name
- Piampatara ubirajarai (Lane, 1966)

Synonyms
- Itaituba ubirajarai Lane, 1966

Species of beetle

Piampatara ubirajarai is a species of beetle in the family Cerambycidae. It was described by Lane in 1966. It is known from Brazil.
