= Nyctonympha flavipes =

Scientific classification
- Kingdom: Animalia
- Phylum: Arthropoda
- Class: Insecta
- Order: Coleoptera
- Suborder: Polyphaga
- Infraorder: Cucujiformia
- Family: Cerambycidae
- Genus: Nyctonympha
- Species: N. flavipes

Binomial name
- Nyctonympha flavipes Aurivillius, 1920

Species of beetle

Nyctonympha flavipes is a species of beetle in the family Cerambycidae. It was described by Per Olof Christopher Aurivillius in 1920. It is known from Bolivia, Ecuador, Brazil, and Peru.
