= Micatocomus =

Scientific classification
- Kingdom: Animalia
- Phylum: Arthropoda
- Class: Insecta
- Order: Coleoptera
- Suborder: Polyphaga
- Infraorder: Cucujiformia
- Family: Cerambycidae
- Tribe: Calliini
- Genus: Micatocomus

Genus of beetles

Micatocomus is a genus of longhorn beetles of the subfamily Lamiinae.

- Micatocomus isomeroides Galileo & Martins, 1988
- Micatocomus petalacmoides Galileo & Martins, 1988
