= Saepiseuthes chilensis =

Scientific classification
- Kingdom: Animalia
- Phylum: Arthropoda
- Class: Insecta
- Order: Coleoptera
- Suborder: Polyphaga
- Infraorder: Cucujiformia
- Family: Cerambycidae
- Genus: Saepiseuthes
- Species: S. chilensis

Binomial name
- Saepiseuthes chilensis Thomson, 1868

Species of beetle

Saepiseuthes chilensis is a species of beetle in the family Cerambycidae. It was described by Thomson in 1868. It is known from Chile.
