= Euryestola antennalis =

Scientific classification
- Kingdom: Animalia
- Phylum: Arthropoda
- Class: Insecta
- Order: Coleoptera
- Suborder: Polyphaga
- Infraorder: Cucujiformia
- Family: Cerambycidae
- Genus: Euryestola
- Species: E. antennalis

Binomial name
- Euryestola antennalis Breuning, 1940

Species of beetle

Euryestola antennalis is a species of beetle in the family Cerambycidae. It was described by Breuning in 1940. It is known from Venezuela and Brazil.
