= Nyctonympha costipennis =

Scientific classification
- Kingdom: Animalia
- Phylum: Arthropoda
- Class: Insecta
- Order: Coleoptera
- Suborder: Polyphaga
- Infraorder: Cucujiformia
- Family: Cerambycidae
- Genus: Nyctonympha
- Species: N. costipennis

Binomial name
- Nyctonympha costipennis (Lameere, 1893)

Species of beetle

Nyctonympha costipennis is a species of beetle in the family Cerambycidae. It was described by Lameere in 1893. It is known from Venezuela.
