= Mesestola =

Scientific classification
- Kingdom: Animalia
- Phylum: Arthropoda
- Class: Insecta
- Order: Coleoptera
- Suborder: Polyphaga
- Infraorder: Cucujiformia
- Family: Cerambycidae
- Tribe: Calliini
- Genus: Mesestola

Genus of beetles

Mesestola is a genus of longhorn beetles in the subfamily Lamiinae.

== Species ==
- Mesestola brochieri Touroult, 2007
- Mesestola guadeloupensis Breuning, 1980
