= Euryestola freyi =

Scientific classification
- Kingdom: Animalia
- Phylum: Arthropoda
- Class: Insecta
- Order: Coleoptera
- Suborder: Polyphaga
- Infraorder: Cucujiformia
- Family: Cerambycidae
- Genus: Euryestola
- Species: E. freyi

Binomial name
- Euryestola freyi Breuning, 1955

Species of beetle

Euryestola freyi is a species of beetle in the family Cerambycidae. It was described by Breuning in 1955. It is known from Trinidad and Tobago.
