= Mesestola brochieri =

Scientific classification
- Kingdom: Animalia
- Phylum: Arthropoda
- Class: Insecta
- Order: Coleoptera
- Suborder: Polyphaga
- Infraorder: Cucujiformia
- Family: Cerambycidae
- Genus: Mesestola
- Species: M. brochieri

Binomial name
- Mesestola brochieri Touroult, 2007

Species of beetle

Mesestola brochieri is a species of beetle in the family Cerambycidae. It was described by Touroult in 2007.
