= Hemicladus dejeanii =

Scientific classification
- Domain: Eukaryota
- Kingdom: Animalia
- Phylum: Arthropoda
- Class: Insecta
- Order: Coleoptera
- Suborder: Polyphaga
- Infraorder: Cucujiformia
- Family: Cerambycidae
- Genus: Hemicladus
- Species: H. dejeanii

Binomial name
- Hemicladus dejeanii Buquet, 1857

Species of beetle

Hemicladus dejeanii is a species of beetle in the family Cerambycidae. It was described by Buquet in 1857. It is known from Brazil and French Guiana.
