= Mimolaia calopterona =

Scientific classification
- Domain: Eukaryota
- Kingdom: Animalia
- Phylum: Arthropoda
- Class: Insecta
- Order: Coleoptera
- Suborder: Polyphaga
- Infraorder: Cucujiformia
- Family: Cerambycidae
- Genus: Mimolaia
- Species: M. calopterona

Binomial name
- Mimolaia calopterona (Bates, 1885)

Species of beetle

Mimolaia calopterona is a species of beetle in the family Cerambycidae. It was described by Bates in 1885. It is known from Panama and Costa Rica.
