= Anapsicomus lampyroides =

Scientific classification
- Kingdom: Animalia
- Phylum: Arthropoda
- Class: Insecta
- Order: Coleoptera
- Suborder: Polyphaga
- Infraorder: Cucujiformia
- Family: Cerambycidae
- Genus: Anapsicomus
- Species: A. lampyroides

Binomial name
- Anapsicomus lampyroides (Bates, 1866)

Synonyms
- Callia lampyroides Bates, 1866; Zenicomus lampyroides Bates, 1885

Species of beetle

Anapsicomus lampyroides is a species of beetle in the family Cerambycidae. It was described by Bates in 1866. It is known from Brazil.
