= Nyctonympha punctata =

Scientific classification
- Kingdom: Animalia
- Phylum: Arthropoda
- Class: Insecta
- Order: Coleoptera
- Suborder: Polyphaga
- Infraorder: Cucujiformia
- Family: Cerambycidae
- Genus: Nyctonympha
- Species: N. punctata

Binomial name
- Nyctonympha punctata Martins & Galileo, 1989

Species of beetle

Nyctonympha punctata is a species of beetle in the family Cerambycidae. It was described by Martins and Galileo in 1989. It is known from Argentina.
