= Eumimesis germana =

Scientific classification
- Domain: Eukaryota
- Kingdom: Animalia
- Phylum: Arthropoda
- Class: Insecta
- Order: Coleoptera
- Suborder: Polyphaga
- Infraorder: Cucujiformia
- Family: Cerambycidae
- Genus: Eumimesis
- Species: E. germana

Binomial name
- Eumimesis germana Lane, 1973

Species of beetle

Eumimesis germana is a species of beetle in the family Cerambycidae. It was described by Lane in 1973. It is known from Brazil.
