= Asemolea =

Scientific classification
- Domain: Eukaryota
- Kingdom: Animalia
- Phylum: Arthropoda
- Class: Insecta
- Order: Coleoptera
- Suborder: Polyphaga
- Infraorder: Cucujiformia
- Family: Cerambycidae
- Subfamily: Lamiinae
- Tribe: Calliini
- Genus: Asemolea; Bates, 1881

Genus of beetles

Asemolea is a genus of longhorn beetles in the tribe Calliini.

- Asemolea crassicornis Bates, 1881
- Asemolea flava Martins & Galileo, 2006
- Asemolea macaranduba Galileo & Martins, 1998
- Asemolea minuta (Bates, 1872)
- Asemolea purpuricollis Bates, 1885
- Asemolea setosa Bates, 1881
