= Hastatis =

Scientific classification
- Kingdom: Animalia
- Phylum: Arthropoda
- Class: Insecta
- Order: Coleoptera
- Suborder: Polyphaga
- Infraorder: Cucujiformia
- Family: Cerambycidae
- Subfamily: Lamiinae
- Tribe: Calliini
- Genus: Hastatis; Buquet, 1857

Genus of beetles

Hastatis is a genus of longhorn beetles of the subfamily Lamiinae.

- Hastatis auricollis Buquet, 1857
- Hastatis denticollis Buquet, 1857
- Hastatis femoralis Burmeister, 1865
- Hastatis simplicis Galileo & Martins, 1990
