= Eumimesis heilipoides =

Scientific classification
- Domain: Eukaryota
- Kingdom: Animalia
- Phylum: Arthropoda
- Class: Insecta
- Order: Coleoptera
- Suborder: Polyphaga
- Infraorder: Cucujiformia
- Family: Cerambycidae
- Genus: Eumimesis
- Species: E. heilipoides

Binomial name
- Eumimesis heilipoides Bates, 1866

Species of beetle

Eumimesis heilipoides is a species of beetle in the family Cerambycidae. It was described by Henry Walter Bates in 1866. It is known from Brazil, French Guiana, Peru and Ecuador.
