= Graminea tomentosa =

Scientific classification
- Kingdom: Animalia
- Phylum: Arthropoda
- Class: Insecta
- Order: Coleoptera
- Suborder: Polyphaga
- Infraorder: Cucujiformia
- Family: Cerambycidae
- Genus: Graminea
- Species: G. tomentosa

Binomial name
- Graminea tomentosa Thomson, 1864

Species of beetle

Graminea tomentosa is a species of beetle in the family Cerambycidae. It was described by Thomson in 1864. It is known from Brazil.
