= Hemicladus decoratus =

Scientific classification
- Domain: Eukaryota
- Kingdom: Animalia
- Phylum: Arthropoda
- Class: Insecta
- Order: Coleoptera
- Suborder: Polyphaga
- Infraorder: Cucujiformia
- Family: Cerambycidae
- Genus: Hemicladus
- Species: H. decoratus

Binomial name
- Hemicladus decoratus E. Fuchs, 1955

Species of beetle

Hemicladus decoratus is a species of beetle in the family Cerambycidae. It was described by Ernst Fuchs in 1955. It is known from Bolivia.
