= Falsamblesthis pilula =

Scientific classification
- Kingdom: Animalia
- Phylum: Arthropoda
- Class: Insecta
- Order: Coleoptera
- Suborder: Polyphaga
- Infraorder: Cucujiformia
- Family: Cerambycidae
- Genus: Falsamblesthis
- Species: F. pilula

Binomial name
- Falsamblesthis pilula Galileo & Martins, 1987

Species of beetle

Falsamblesthis pilula is a species of beetle in the family Cerambycidae. It was described by Galileo and Martins in 1987. It is known from Colombia.
