= Callisema socium =

Scientific classification
- Kingdom: Animalia
- Phylum: Arthropoda
- Class: Insecta
- Order: Coleoptera
- Suborder: Polyphaga
- Infraorder: Cucujiformia
- Family: Cerambycidae
- Genus: Callisema
- Species: C. socium

Binomial name
- Callisema socium Martins & Galileo, 1990

Species of beetle

Callisema socium is a species of beetle in the family Cerambycidae. It was described by Martins and Galileo in 1990. It is known from Argentina and Brazil.
