= Eumathes colombicus =

Scientific classification
- Kingdom: Animalia
- Phylum: Arthropoda
- Class: Insecta
- Order: Coleoptera
- Suborder: Polyphaga
- Infraorder: Cucujiformia
- Family: Cerambycidae
- Genus: Eumathes
- Species: E. colombicus

Binomial name
- Eumathes colombicus (Thomson, 1868)

Species of beetle

Eumathes colombicus is a species of beetle in the family Cerambycidae. It was described by Thomson in 1868. It is known from Colombia.
