= Eumimesis carbonelli =

Scientific classification
- Domain: Eukaryota
- Kingdom: Animalia
- Phylum: Arthropoda
- Class: Insecta
- Order: Coleoptera
- Suborder: Polyphaga
- Infraorder: Cucujiformia
- Family: Cerambycidae
- Genus: Eumimesis
- Species: E. carbonelli

Binomial name
- Eumimesis carbonelli Lane, 1973

Species of beetle

Eumimesis carbonelli is a species of beetle in the family Cerambycidae. It was described by Lane in 1973. It is known from Ecuador and Peru. It is named in honour of the Uruguayan entomologist Carlos S. Carbonell (1917–2019).
