= Mimolaia annulata =

Scientific classification
- Domain: Eukaryota
- Kingdom: Animalia
- Phylum: Arthropoda
- Class: Insecta
- Order: Coleoptera
- Suborder: Polyphaga
- Infraorder: Cucujiformia
- Family: Cerambycidae
- Genus: Mimolaia
- Species: M. annulata

Binomial name
- Mimolaia annulata Galileo & Martins, 2010

Species of beetle

Mimolaia annulata is a species of beetle in the family Cerambycidae. It was described by Galileo and Martins in 2010. It is known from Ecuador.
