= Graminea =

Scientific classification
- Kingdom: Animalia
- Phylum: Arthropoda
- Class: Insecta
- Order: Coleoptera
- Suborder: Polyphaga
- Infraorder: Cucujiformia
- Family: Cerambycidae
- Subfamily: Lamiinae
- Tribe: Calliini
- Genus: Graminea; Thomson, 1864

Genus of beetles

Graminea is a genus of longhorn beetles of the subfamily Lamiinae.

- Graminea annulata Galileo & Martins, 1990
- Graminea hispida Galileo & Martins, 1990
- Graminea inca Galileo & Martins, 1990
- Graminea multicava Galileo & Martins, 1990
- Graminea rubra Martins & Galileo, 2006
- Graminea tomentosa Thomson, 1864
