= Hastatis auricollis =

Scientific classification
- Kingdom: Animalia
- Phylum: Arthropoda
- Class: Insecta
- Order: Coleoptera
- Suborder: Polyphaga
- Infraorder: Cucujiformia
- Family: Cerambycidae
- Genus: Hastatis
- Species: H. auricollis

Binomial name
- Hastatis auricollis Buquet, 1857

Synonyms
- Callia auricollis (Buquet, 1857)

Species of beetle

Hastatis auricollis is a species of beetle in the family Cerambycidae. It was described by Buquet in 1857. It is known from Brazil.
