= Hastatis simplicis =

Scientific classification
- Kingdom: Animalia
- Phylum: Arthropoda
- Class: Insecta
- Order: Coleoptera
- Suborder: Polyphaga
- Infraorder: Cucujiformia
- Family: Cerambycidae
- Genus: Hastatis
- Species: H. simplicis

Binomial name
- Hastatis simplicis Galileo & Martins, 1990

Species of beetle

Hastatis simplicis is a species of beetle in the family Cerambycidae. It was described by Galileo and Martins in 1990. It is known from Brazil.
