= Nyctonympha boyacana =

Scientific classification
- Kingdom: Animalia
- Phylum: Arthropoda
- Class: Insecta
- Order: Coleoptera
- Suborder: Polyphaga
- Infraorder: Cucujiformia
- Family: Cerambycidae
- Genus: Nyctonympha
- Species: N. boyacana

Binomial name
- Nyctonympha boyacana Galileo & Martins, 2008

Species of beetle

Nyctonympha boyacana is a species of beetle in the family Cerambycidae. It was described by Galileo and Martins in 2008. It is known from Colombia.
