= Calliomorpha =

Scientific classification
- Domain: Eukaryota
- Kingdom: Animalia
- Phylum: Arthropoda
- Class: Insecta
- Order: Coleoptera
- Suborder: Polyphaga
- Infraorder: Cucujiformia
- Family: Cerambycidae
- Tribe: Calliini
- Genus: Calliomorpha
- Species: C. cyanoptera

Binomial name
- Calliomorpha cyanoptera Lane, 1973

Genus of beetles

Calliomorpha cyanoptera is a species of beetle in the family Cerambycidae, and the only species in the genus Calliomorpha. It was described by Lane in 1973.
