= Micatocomus petalacmoides =

Scientific classification
- Kingdom: Animalia
- Phylum: Arthropoda
- Class: Insecta
- Order: Coleoptera
- Suborder: Polyphaga
- Infraorder: Cucujiformia
- Family: Cerambycidae
- Genus: Micatocomus
- Species: M. petalacmoides

Binomial name
- Micatocomus petalacmoides Galileo & Martins, 1988

Synonyms
- Micatomus petalacmoides Galileo & Martins, 1988

Species of beetle

Micatocomus petalacmoides is a species of beetle in the family Cerambycidae. It was described by Galileo and Martins in 1988. It is known from Brazil.
