= Saepiseuthes obliquatus =

Scientific classification
- Kingdom: Animalia
- Phylum: Arthropoda
- Class: Insecta
- Order: Coleoptera
- Suborder: Polyphaga
- Infraorder: Cucujiformia
- Family: Cerambycidae
- Genus: Saepiseuthes
- Species: S. obliquatus

Binomial name
- Saepiseuthes obliquatus (Fairmaire & Germain, 1859)

Species of beetle

Saepiseuthes obliquatus is a species of beetle in the family Cerambycidae. It was described by Fairmaire and Germain in 1859. It is known from Chile.
