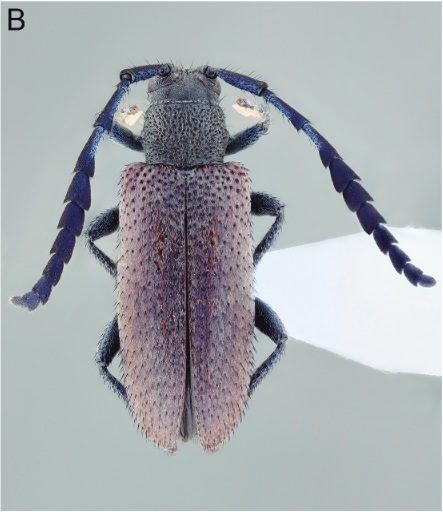

Scientific classification
- Kingdom: Animalia
- Phylum: Arthropoda
- Clade: Pancrustacea
- Class: Insecta
- Order: Coleoptera
- Suborder: Polyphaga
- Infraorder: Cucujiformia
- Family: Cerambycidae
- Genus: Hemicladus
- Species: H. thomsonii

Binomial name
- Hemicladus thomsonii Buquet, 1857

= Hemicladus thomsonii =

Species of beetle

Hemicladus thomsonii is a species of beetle in the family Cerambycidae. It was described by Buquet in 1857. It is found in Bolivia, French Guiana, Brazil (Rondônia, Mato Grosso, Mato Grosso do Sul, Goiás, Minas Gerais, Rio de Janeiro, São Paulo) and Paraguay.
