= Euryestola morotinga =

Scientific classification
- Kingdom: Animalia
- Phylum: Arthropoda
- Class: Insecta
- Order: Coleoptera
- Suborder: Polyphaga
- Infraorder: Cucujiformia
- Family: Cerambycidae
- Genus: Euryestola
- Species: E. morotinga

Binomial name
- Euryestola morotinga Galileo & Martins, 1997

Species of beetle

Euryestola morotinga is a species of beetle in the family Cerambycidae. It was described by Galileo and Martins in 1997. It is endemic to Brazil.
