= Callityrinthia =

Scientific classification
- Domain: Eukaryota
- Kingdom: Animalia
- Phylum: Arthropoda
- Class: Insecta
- Order: Coleoptera
- Suborder: Polyphaga
- Infraorder: Cucujiformia
- Family: Cerambycidae
- Tribe: Calliini
- Genus: Callityrinthia
- Species: C. mimetica

Binomial name
- Callityrinthia mimetica Galileo & Martins, 1991

Genus of beetles

Callityrinthia mimetica is a species of beetle in the family Cerambycidae, and the only species in the genus Callityrinthia. It was described by Galileo and Martins in 1991.
