= Canindea =

Scientific classification
- Kingdom: Animalia
- Phylum: Arthropoda
- Class: Insecta
- Order: Coleoptera
- Suborder: Polyphaga
- Infraorder: Cucujiformia
- Family: Cerambycidae
- Tribe: Calliini
- Genus: Canindea

Genus of beetles

Canindea is a genus of longhorn beetles of the subfamily Lamiinae.

- Canindea latithorax Galileo & Martins, 1991
- Canindea maculata Galileo & Martins, 1990
- Canindea signaticornis (Buquet, 1857)
