= Itacolomi =

Scientific classification
- Kingdom: Animalia
- Phylum: Arthropoda
- Class: Insecta
- Order: Coleoptera
- Suborder: Polyphaga
- Infraorder: Cucujiformia
- Family: Cerambycidae
- Subfamily: Lamiinae
- Tribe: Forsteriini
- Genus: Itacolomi; Galileo & Martins, 2012
- Species: I. letiziae

Binomial name
- Itacolomi letiziae Galileo & Martins, 2012

Genus of beetles

Itacolomi letiziae is a species of beetle in the family Cerambycidae. It was described by Galileo and Martins in 2012. It is the only species in the genus Itacolomi.
