= Eumimesis =

Scientific classification
- Domain: Eukaryota
- Kingdom: Animalia
- Phylum: Arthropoda
- Class: Insecta
- Order: Coleoptera
- Suborder: Polyphaga
- Infraorder: Cucujiformia
- Family: Cerambycidae
- Tribe: Calliini
- Genus: Eumimesis

Genus of beetles

Eumimesis is a genus of longhorn beetles of the subfamily Lamiinae.

- Eumimesis affinis Magno & Monné, 1990
- Eumimesis carbonelli Lane, 1973
- Eumimesis germana Lane, 1973
- Eumimesis heilipoides Bates, 1866
- Eumimesis trilineata Magno & Monné, 1990
