= Paracallia =

Scientific classification
- Kingdom: Animalia
- Phylum: Arthropoda
- Class: Insecta
- Order: Coleoptera
- Suborder: Polyphaga
- Infraorder: Cucujiformia
- Family: Cerambycidae
- Tribe: Calliini
- Genus: Paracallia

Genus of beetles

Paracallia is a genus of longhorn beetles of the subfamily Lamiinae.

- Paracallia bonaldoi Martins & Galileo, 1998
- Paracallia giesberti Martins & Galileo, 2006
