= Mimolaia pichincha =

Scientific classification
- Domain: Eukaryota
- Kingdom: Animalia
- Phylum: Arthropoda
- Class: Insecta
- Order: Coleoptera
- Suborder: Polyphaga
- Infraorder: Cucujiformia
- Family: Cerambycidae
- Genus: Mimolaia
- Species: M. pichincha

Binomial name
- Mimolaia pichincha Galileo & Martins, 1992

Species of beetle

Mimolaia pichincha is a species of beetle in the family Cerambycidae. It was described by Galileo and Martins in 1992. It is known from Ecuador.
