= Asemolea crassicornis =

Scientific classification
- Kingdom: Animalia
- Phylum: Arthropoda
- Class: Insecta
- Order: Coleoptera
- Suborder: Polyphaga
- Infraorder: Cucujiformia
- Family: Cerambycidae
- Genus: Asemolea
- Species: A. crassicornis

Binomial name
- Asemolea crassicornis Bates, 1881

Species of beetle

Asemolea crassicornis is a species of beetle in the family Cerambycidae. It was described by Bates in 1881. It is known from Mexico and Belize.
