= Asemolea flava =

Scientific classification
- Kingdom: Animalia
- Phylum: Arthropoda
- Clade: Pancrustacea
- Class: Insecta
- Order: Coleoptera
- Suborder: Polyphaga
- Infraorder: Cucujiformia
- Family: Cerambycidae
- Genus: Asemolea
- Species: A. flava

Binomial name
- Asemolea flava Martins & Galileo, 2006

Species of beetle

Asemolea flava is a species of beetle in the family Cerambycidae. It was described by Martins and Galileo in 2006. It is found in Costa Rica.
