= Obereoides parahybanus =

Scientific classification
- Kingdom: Animalia
- Phylum: Arthropoda
- Class: Insecta
- Order: Coleoptera
- Suborder: Polyphaga
- Infraorder: Cucujiformia
- Family: Cerambycidae
- Genus: Obereoides
- Species: O. parahybanus

Binomial name
- Obereoides parahybanus Galileo & Martins, 1998

Species of beetle

Obereoides parahybanus is a species of beetle in the family Cerambycidae. It was described by Galileo and Martins in 1998. It is known from Brazil.
