= Piampatara humeralis =

Scientific classification
- Domain: Eukaryota
- Kingdom: Animalia
- Phylum: Arthropoda
- Class: Insecta
- Order: Coleoptera
- Suborder: Polyphaga
- Infraorder: Cucujiformia
- Family: Cerambycidae
- Genus: Piampatara
- Species: P. humeralis

Binomial name
- Piampatara humeralis (Aurivillius, 1916)

Synonyms
- Hilarolea humeralis Aurivillius, 1916

Species of beetle

Piampatara humeralis is a species of beetle in the family Cerambycidae. It was described by Per Olof Christopher Aurivillius in 1916 and is known from Brazil.
