= Neocallia =

Scientific classification
- Kingdom: Animalia
- Phylum: Arthropoda
- Class: Insecta
- Order: Coleoptera
- Suborder: Polyphaga
- Infraorder: Cucujiformia
- Family: Cerambycidae
- Genus: Neocallia
- Species: N. pubescens

Binomial name
- Neocallia pubescens Fisher, 1933

Genus of beetles

Neocallia pubescens is a species of beetle in the family Cerambycidae, and the only species in the genus Neocallia. It was described by Fisher in 1933.
