= Parasemolea =

Scientific classification
- Kingdom: Animalia
- Phylum: Arthropoda
- Class: Insecta
- Order: Coleoptera
- Suborder: Polyphaga
- Infraorder: Cucujiformia
- Family: Cerambycidae
- Genus: Parasemolea
- Species: P. boliviana

Binomial name
- Parasemolea boliviana Martins & Galileo, 1990

Genus of beetles

Parasemolea boliviana is a species of beetle in the family Cerambycidae, and the only species in the genus Parasemolea. It was described by Martins and Galileo in 1990.
