= Pseudogisostola =

Scientific classification
- Kingdom: Animalia
- Phylum: Arthropoda
- Class: Insecta
- Order: Coleoptera
- Suborder: Polyphaga
- Infraorder: Cucujiformia
- Family: Cerambycidae
- Genus: Pseudogisostola
- Species: P. reichardti

Binomial name
- Pseudogisostola reichardti Fontes & Martins, 1977

Genus of beetles

Pseudogisostola reichardti is a species of beetle in the family Cerambycidae and the sole species in the genus Pseudogisostola. It was described by Fontes and Martins in 1977.
