= Huedepohlia =

Scientific classification
- Kingdom: Animalia
- Phylum: Arthropoda
- Class: Insecta
- Order: Coleoptera
- Suborder: Polyphaga
- Infraorder: Cucujiformia
- Family: Cerambycidae
- Genus: Huedepohlia
- Species: H. pisciformis

Binomial name
- Huedepohlia pisciformis Martins & Galileo, 1989

Genus of beetles

Huedepohlia pisciformis is a species of beetle in the family Cerambycidae, and the only species in the genus Huedepohlia. It was described by Martins and Galileo in 1989.
