= Acreana =

Scientific classification
- Domain: Eukaryota
- Kingdom: Animalia
- Phylum: Arthropoda
- Class: Insecta
- Order: Coleoptera
- Suborder: Polyphaga
- Infraorder: Cucujiformia
- Family: Cerambycidae
- Genus: Acreana
- Species: A. cuprea

Binomial name
- Acreana cuprea Lane, 1973

Genus of beetles

Acreana is a genus of beetles in the family Cerambycidae, containing a single species, Acreana cuprea. It was described by Lane in 1973.
