= Xenocallia =

Scientific classification
- Domain: Eukaryota
- Kingdom: Animalia
- Phylum: Arthropoda
- Class: Insecta
- Order: Coleoptera
- Suborder: Polyphaga
- Infraorder: Cucujiformia
- Family: Cerambycidae
- Genus: Xenocallia
- Species: X. punctatissima

Binomial name
- Xenocallia punctatissima Galileo & Martins, 1990

Genus of beetles

Xenocallia punctatissima is a species of beetle in the family Cerambycidae, and the only species in the genus Xenocallia. It was described by Galileo and Martins in 1990.
