= Yapyguara =

Scientific classification
- Kingdom: Animalia
- Phylum: Arthropoda
- Class: Insecta
- Order: Coleoptera
- Suborder: Polyphaga
- Infraorder: Cucujiformia
- Family: Cerambycidae
- Genus: Yapyguara
- Species: Y. fusca

Binomial name
- Yapyguara fusca Galileo & Martins, 2012

Genus of beetles

Yapyguara fusca is a species of beetle in the family Cerambycidae, and the only species in the genus Yapyguara. It was described by Galileo and Martins in 2012.
