= Chereas =

Scientific classification
- Kingdom: Animalia
- Phylum: Arthropoda
- Class: Insecta
- Order: Coleoptera
- Suborder: Polyphaga
- Infraorder: Cucujiformia
- Family: Cerambycidae
- Genus: Chereas
- Species: C. octomaculata

Binomial name
- Chereas octomaculata (Buquet, 1857)

Genus of beetles

Chereas octomaculata is a species of beetle in the family Cerambycidae, and the only species in the genus Chereas. It was described by Buquet in 1857.
