= Chalcolyne =

Scientific classification
- Kingdom: Animalia
- Phylum: Arthropoda
- Class: Insecta
- Order: Coleoptera
- Suborder: Polyphaga
- Infraorder: Cucujiformia
- Family: Cerambycidae
- Genus: Chalcolyne
- Species: C. metallica

Binomial name
- Chalcolyne metallica (Pascoe, 1858)

Genus of beetles

Chalcolyne metallica is a species of beetle in the family Cerambycidae, and the only species in the genus Chalcolyne. It was described by Pascoe in 1858.
