= Camixaima =

Scientific classification
- Kingdom: Animalia
- Phylum: Arthropoda
- Class: Insecta
- Order: Coleoptera
- Suborder: Polyphaga
- Infraorder: Cucujiformia
- Family: Cerambycidae
- Genus: Camixaima
- Species: C. beraba

Binomial name
- Camixaima beraba Martins & Galileo, 1996

Genus of beetles

Camixaima beraba is a species of beetle in the family Cerambycidae, and the only species in the genus Camixaima. It was described by Martins and Galileo in 1996.
