= Rumuara =

Scientific classification
- Kingdom: Animalia
- Phylum: Arthropoda
- Class: Insecta
- Order: Coleoptera
- Suborder: Polyphaga
- Infraorder: Cucujiformia
- Family: Cerambycidae
- Genus: Rumuara
- Species: R. fasciatus

Binomial name
- Rumuara fasciatus (Martins & Galileo, 1990)

Genus of beetles

Rumuara fasciatus is a species of beetle in the family Cerambycidae, and the only species in the genus Rumuara. It was described by Martins and Galileo in 1990.
