= Igualda =

Scientific classification
- Domain: Eukaryota
- Kingdom: Animalia
- Phylum: Arthropoda
- Class: Insecta
- Order: Coleoptera
- Suborder: Polyphaga
- Infraorder: Cucujiformia
- Family: Cerambycidae
- Subfamily: Lamiinae
- Tribe: Calliini
- Genus: Igualda
- Species: I. posticalis

Binomial name
- Igualda posticalis Thomson, 1868

Genus of beetles

Igualda posticalis is a species of beetle in the family Cerambycidae, and the only species in the genus Igualda. It is found in South America. It was described by Thomson in 1868.
