= Schiacallia =

Scientific classification
- Kingdom: Animalia
- Phylum: Arthropoda
- Class: Insecta
- Order: Coleoptera
- Suborder: Polyphaga
- Infraorder: Cucujiformia
- Family: Cerambycidae
- Genus: Schiacallia
- Species: S. tristis

Binomial name
- Schiacallia tristis Galileo & Martins, 1991

Genus of beetles

Schiacallia tristis is a species of beetle belonging to the Cerambycidae family, and the only species in the genus Schiacallia. It was described by Galileo and Martins in 1991.
