= Helminda =

Scientific classification
- Kingdom: Animalia
- Phylum: Arthropoda
- Class: Insecta
- Order: Coleoptera
- Suborder: Polyphaga
- Infraorder: Cucujiformia
- Family: Cerambycidae
- Genus: Helminda
- Species: H. pilipennis

Binomial name
- Helminda pilipennis Blanchard in Gay, 1851

Genus of beetles

Helminda pilipennis is a species of beetle in the family Cerambycidae, and the only species in the genus Helminda. It was described by Blanchard in 1851.
