= Spinoblesthis =

Scientific classification
- Kingdom: Animalia
- Phylum: Arthropoda
- Class: Insecta
- Order: Coleoptera
- Suborder: Polyphaga
- Infraorder: Cucujiformia
- Family: Cerambycidae
- Genus: Spinoblesthis
- Species: S. acuta

Binomial name
- Spinoblesthis acuta Galileo & Martins, 1987

Genus of beetles

Spinoblesthis acuta is a species of beetle in the family Cerambycidae, and the only species in the genus Spinoblesthis. It was described by Galileo and Martins in 1987.
