= Icelastatis =

Scientific classification
- Kingdom: Animalia
- Phylum: Arthropoda
- Class: Insecta
- Order: Coleoptera
- Suborder: Polyphaga
- Infraorder: Cucujiformia
- Family: Cerambycidae
- Genus: Icelastatis
- Species: I. galerucoides

Binomial name
- Icelastatis galerucoides (Bates, 1866)

Genus of beetles

Icelastatis galerucoides is a species of beetle in the family Cerambycidae, and the only species in the genus Icelastatis. It was described by Henry Walter Bates in 1866.
