= Lustrocomus =

Scientific classification
- Kingdom: Animalia
- Phylum: Arthropoda
- Class: Insecta
- Order: Coleoptera
- Suborder: Polyphaga
- Infraorder: Cucujiformia
- Family: Cerambycidae
- Genus: Lustrocomus
- Species: L. paraensis

Binomial name
- Lustrocomus paraensis Martins & Galileo, 1996

Genus of beetles

Lustrocomus paraensis is a species of beetle in the family Cerambycidae, and the only species in the genus Lustrocomus. It was described by Martins and Galileo in 1996.
