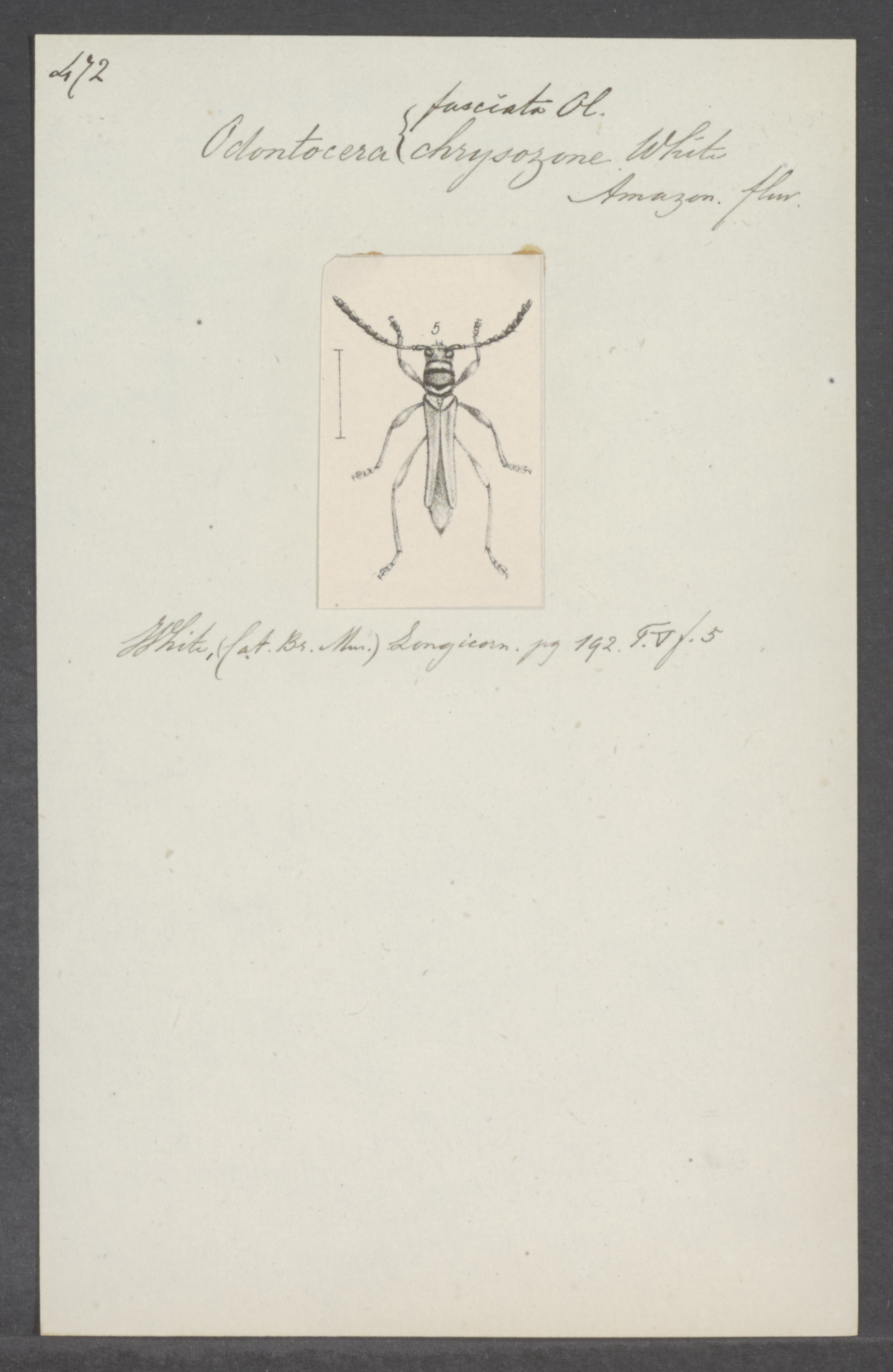
- Odontocera

Scientific classification
- Kingdom: Animalia
- Phylum: Arthropoda
- Clade: Pancrustacea
- Class: Insecta
- Order: Coleoptera
- Suborder: Polyphaga
- Infraorder: Cucujiformia
- Family: Cerambycidae
- Subfamily: Cerambycinae
- Tribe: Rhinotragini
- Genus: Odontocera; Audinet-Serville, 1833

= Odontocera =

Genus of beetles

Odontocera is a genus of beetles in the family Cerambycidae, containing the following species:

- Odontocera albicans (Klug, 1825)
- Odontocera albitarsis Melzer, 1922
- Odontocera annulicornis Magno, 2001
- Odontocera apicula Bates, 1885
- Odontocera armipes Zajciw, 1963
- Odontocera aurocincta Bates, 1873
- Odontocera auropilosa Tippmann, 1953
- Odontocera baeri (Gounelle, 1913)
- Odontocera barnouini Penaherrera-Leiva & Tavakilian, 2003
- Odontocera beneluzi Penaherrera-Leiva & Tavakilian, 2003
- Odontocera bilobata Zajciw, 1965
- Odontocera bisulcata Bates, 1870
- Odontocera buscki Fisher, 1930
- Odontocera chrysostetha Bates, 1870
- Odontocera clara Bates, 1873
- Odontocera colon (Bates, 1870)
- Odontocera compressipes White, 1855
- Odontocera crocata Bates, 1873
- Odontocera cylindrica Audinet-Serville, 1833
- Odontocera darlingtoni Fisher, 1930
- Odontocera dice Newman, 1841
- Odontocera dispar Bates, 1870
- Odontocera exilis Fisher, 1947
- Odontocera fasciata (Olivier, 1795)
- Odontocera furcifera Bates, 1870
- Odontocera fuscicornis Bates, 1885
- Odontocera globicollis Zajciw, 1971
- Odontocera gracilis (Klug, 1825)
- Odontocera hilaris Bates, 1873
- Odontocera hirundipennis Zajciw, 1962
- Odontocera javieri Tavakilian & Penaherrera-Leiva, 2003
- Odontocera josemartii Zayas, 1956
- Odontocera leucothea Bates, 1873
- Odontocera lineatocollis Melzer, 1934
- Odontocera longipennis Zajciw, 1962
- Odontocera malleri Melzer, 1934
- Odontocera margaritacea (Fabricius, 1801)
- Odontocera mellea White, 1855
- Odontocera meridiana Fisher, 1953
- Odontocera molorchoides (White, 1855)
- Odontocera monnei Da Silva, Monne, Santos-Silva & Rafael, 2026
- Odontocera monostigma (Bates, 1869)
- Odontocera morii Tavakilian & Penaherrera-Leiva, 2003
- Odontocera nigriclavis Bates, 1873
- Odontocera nigrovittata Tavakilian & Penaherrera-Leiva, 2003
- Odontocera ochracea Monné & Magno, 1988
- Odontocera ornaticollis Bates, 1870
- Odontocera parallela White, 1855
- Odontocera petiolata Bates, 1873
- Odontocera poecilopoda White, 1855
- Odontocera punctata (Klug, 1825)
- Odontocera pusilla Gounelle, 1911
- Odontocera quadrivittata Melzer, 1922
- Odontocera quiinaphila Penaherrera-Leiva & Tavakilian, 2003
- Odontocera sabatieri Tavakilian & Penaherrera-Leiva, 2003
- Odontocera scabricollis Melzer, 1934
- Odontocera signatipennis Zajciw, 1971
- Odontocera simplex White, 1855
- Odontocera solangae Magno, 2001
- Odontocera subtilis Monné & Magno, 1988
- Odontocera susanae Da Silva, Monne, Santos-Silva & Rafael, 2026
- Odontocera tibialis Zajciw, 1971
- Odontocera tridentifera Gounelle, 1913
- Odontocera triliturata Bates, 1870
- Odontocera triplaris Fisher, 1930
- Odontocera trisignata Gounelle, 1911
- Odontocera tuberculata Zajciw, 1967
- Odontocera tumidicollis Zajciw, 1965
- Odontocera typhoeus Fisher, 1947
- Odontocera villosa Monné & Magno, 1988
- Odontocera virgata Gounelle, 1911
- Odontocera vittipennis Bates, 1873
- Odontocera zeteki Fisher, 1930
- Odontocera zikani Melzer, 1927

== Selected former species ==
- Odontocera apicalis (Klug, 1825)
- Odontocera flavicauda Bates, 1873
- Odontocera flavirostris Melzer, 1930
- Odontocera melzeri Fisher, 1952
- Odontocera monnei Zajciw, 1968
- Odontocera nevermanni Fisher, 1930
- Odontocera quinquecallosa Zajciw, 1963
- Odontocera rugicollis Bates, 1880
- Odontocera sanguinolenta Bates, 1873
- Odontocera septemtuberculata Zajciw, 1963
- Odontocera soror Gounelle, 1911
