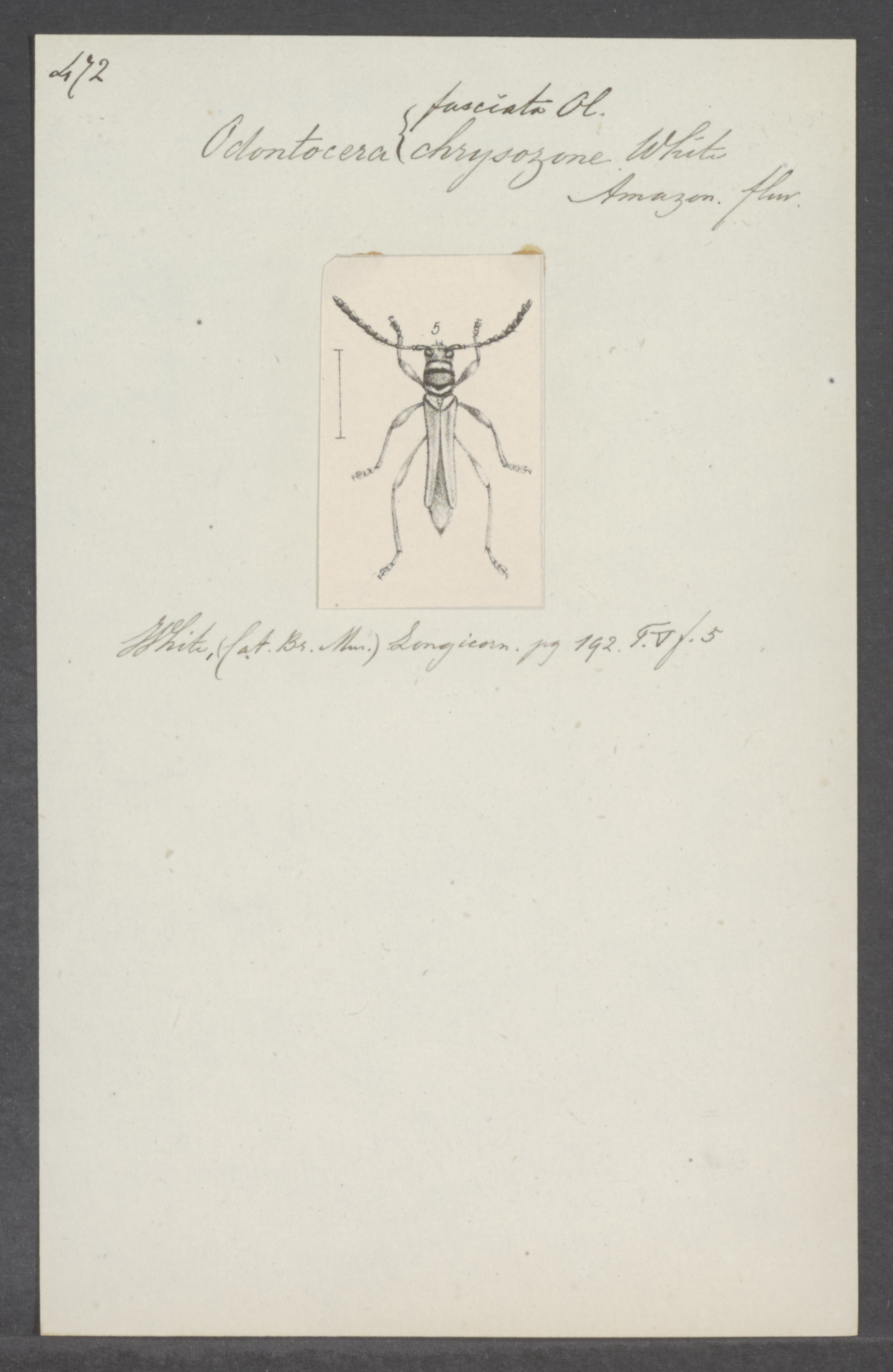
- A print of an Odontocera

Scientific classification
- Kingdom: Animalia
- Phylum: Arthropoda
- Clade: Pancrustacea
- Class: Insecta
- Order: Coleoptera
- Suborder: Polyphaga
- Infraorder: Cucujiformia
- Family: Cerambycidae
- Genus: Odontocera
- Species: O. fasciata

Binomial name
- Odontocera fasciata (Olivier, 1795)

= Odontocera fasciata =

Species of beetle

Odontocera fasciata is a species of beetle in the family Cerambycidae.
