= Odontocera ochracea =

Scientific classification
- Kingdom: Animalia
- Phylum: Arthropoda
- Class: Insecta
- Order: Coleoptera
- Suborder: Polyphaga
- Infraorder: Cucujiformia
- Family: Cerambycidae
- Genus: Odontocera
- Species: O. ochracea

Binomial name
- Odontocera ochracea Monné & Magno, 1988

Species of beetle

Odontocera ochracea is a species of beetle in the family Cerambycidae.
