= Odontocera monostigma =

Scientific classification
- Kingdom: Animalia
- Phylum: Arthropoda
- Class: Insecta
- Order: Coleoptera
- Suborder: Polyphaga
- Infraorder: Cucujiformia
- Family: Cerambycidae
- Genus: Odontocera
- Species: O. monostigma

Binomial name
- Odontocera monostigma (Bates, 1869)

Species of beetle

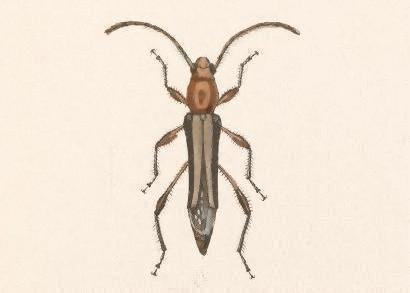
Ommata monostigma.

Odontocera monostigma is a species of beetle in the family Cerambycidae.
