= Odontocera aurocincta =

Scientific classification
- Domain: Eukaryota
- Kingdom: Animalia
- Phylum: Arthropoda
- Class: Insecta
- Order: Coleoptera
- Suborder: Polyphaga
- Infraorder: Cucujiformia
- Family: Cerambycidae
- Genus: Odontocera
- Species: O. aurocincta

Binomial name
- Odontocera aurocincta Bates, 1873

Species of beetle

Odontocera aurocincta is a species of beetle in the family Cerambycidae.
