= Odontocera zeteki =

Scientific classification
- Domain: Eukaryota
- Kingdom: Animalia
- Phylum: Arthropoda
- Class: Insecta
- Order: Coleoptera
- Suborder: Polyphaga
- Infraorder: Cucujiformia
- Family: Cerambycidae
- Genus: Odontocera
- Species: O. zeteki

Binomial name
- Odontocera zeteki Fisher, 1930

Species of beetle

Odontocera zeteki is a species of beetle in the family Cerambycidae. It was described by Warren Samuel Fisher based on specimen(s) from Barro Colorado Island, Panama.
