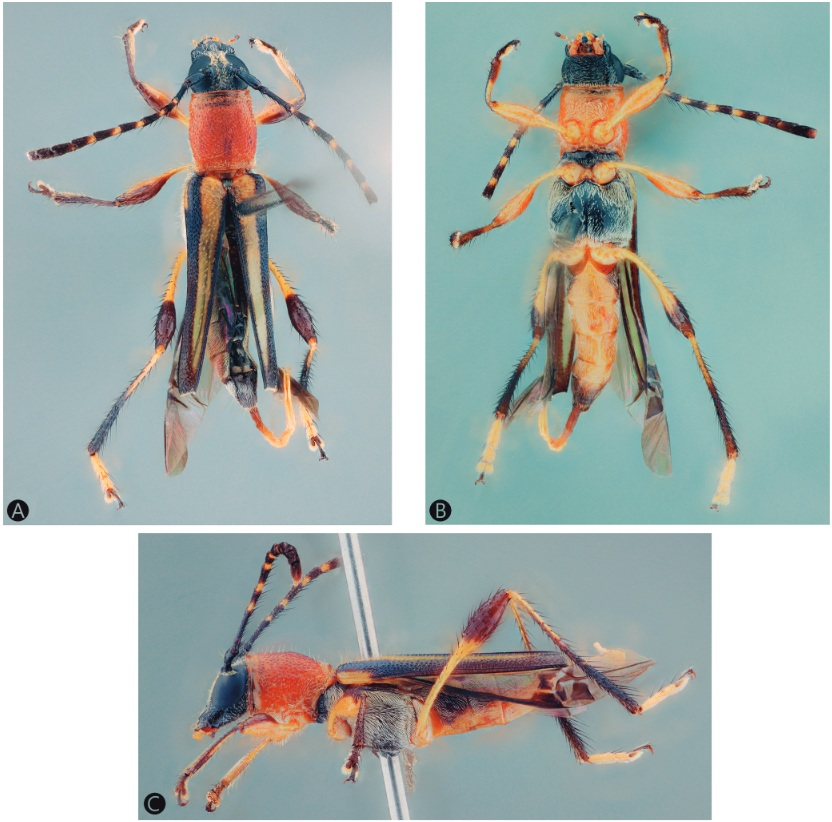

Scientific classification
- Kingdom: Animalia
- Phylum: Arthropoda
- Clade: Pancrustacea
- Class: Insecta
- Order: Coleoptera
- Suborder: Polyphaga
- Infraorder: Cucujiformia
- Family: Cerambycidae
- Genus: Odontocera
- Species: O. monnei

Binomial name
- Odontocera monnei Da Silva, Monne, Santos-Silva & Rafael, 2026

= Odontocera monnei =

Species of beetle

Odontocera monnei is a species of beetle of the family Cerambycidae. It is found in Brazil (Amazonas).

== Description ==
Adults reach a length of about 6.8 mm (0.27 in). The head capsule is black and the prothorax is orange, except for an anterocentral dark‑brown area on the pronotum, two longitudinal, narrow somewhat dark‑brown bands on the center of the posterior half of the pronotum, and irregular dark‑brown area close to the anterior constriction on the prosternum, the partially dark‑brown apex of the prosternal process, and dark‑brown areas on the postcoxal processes. The elytra are black close to the suture, laterally, and apically, gradually dark brown from the middle, except for the orange laterobasal sixth and brown epipleural margin. The remaining surface is yellowish brown anteriorly, becoming gradually paler and translucent toward the dark apical area.

== Etymology ==
The species is named in honour of Dr. Miguel A. Monné.
