= Odontocroton =

Scientific classification
- Kingdom: Animalia
- Phylum: Arthropoda
- Clade: Pancrustacea
- Class: Insecta
- Order: Coleoptera
- Suborder: Polyphaga
- Infraorder: Cucujiformia
- Family: Cerambycidae
- Subfamily: Cerambycinae
- Tribe: Rhinotragini
- Genus: Odontocroton; Clarke, 2018

Genus of beetles

Odontocroton is a genus of beetles belonging to the family Cerambycidae.

== Species ==
- Odontocroton apicalis (Klug, 1825)
- Odontocroton flavicauda (Bates, 1873)
- Odontocroton flavirostris (Melzer, 1930)
- Odontocroton melzeri (Fisher, 1952)
- Odontocroton monnei (Zajciw, 1968)
- Odontocroton quinquecallosus (Zajciw, 1963)
- Odontocroton rufifrons (Fisher, 1937)
- Odontocroton sanguinolentus (Bates, 1873)
- Odontocroton septemtuberculatus (Zajciw, 1963)
- Odontocroton soror (Gounelle, 1911)
