= Odontocera scabricollis =

Scientific classification
- Kingdom: Animalia
- Phylum: Arthropoda
- Class: Insecta
- Order: Coleoptera
- Suborder: Polyphaga
- Infraorder: Cucujiformia
- Family: Cerambycidae
- Genus: Odontocera
- Species: O. scabricollis

Binomial name
- Odontocera scabricollis Melzer, 1934

Species of beetle

Odontocera scabricollis is a species of beetle in the family Cerambycidae.
