= Odontocera nigriclavis =

Scientific classification
- Kingdom: Animalia
- Phylum: Arthropoda
- Clade: Pancrustacea
- Class: Insecta
- Order: Coleoptera
- Suborder: Polyphaga
- Infraorder: Cucujiformia
- Family: Cerambycidae
- Genus: Odontocera
- Species: O. nigriclavis

Binomial name
- Odontocera nigriclavis Bates, 1873

Species of beetle

Odontocera nigriclavis is a species of beetle in the family Cerambycidae. It is found in Brazil (Bahia, Minas Gerais, Espírito Santo, Rio de Janeiro, São Paulo, Paraná, Santa Catarina, Rio Grande do Sul) and Argentina (Misiones).
