= Odontocera parallela =

Scientific classification
- Kingdom: Animalia
- Phylum: Arthropoda
- Class: Insecta
- Order: Coleoptera
- Suborder: Polyphaga
- Infraorder: Cucujiformia
- Family: Cerambycidae
- Genus: Odontocera
- Species: O. parallela

Binomial name
- Odontocera parallela White, 1855

Species of beetle

Odontocera parallela is a species of beetle in the family Cerambycidae. It is found in the state of Amapá, Brazil.
