= Odontocera exilis =

Scientific classification
- Kingdom: Animalia
- Phylum: Arthropoda
- Class: Insecta
- Order: Coleoptera
- Suborder: Polyphaga
- Infraorder: Cucujiformia
- Family: Cerambycidae
- Genus: Odontocera
- Species: O. exilis

Binomial name
- Odontocera exilis Fisher, 1947

Species of beetle

Odontocera exilis is a species of beetle in the family Cerambycidae.
