= Odontocroton rufifrons =

Scientific classification
- Kingdom: Animalia
- Phylum: Arthropoda
- Clade: Pancrustacea
- Class: Insecta
- Order: Coleoptera
- Suborder: Polyphaga
- Infraorder: Cucujiformia
- Family: Cerambycidae
- Genus: Odontocroton
- Species: O. rufifrons

Binomial name
- Odontocroton rufifrons (Fisher, 1937)

Synonyms
- Odontocera sanguinolenta var. rufifrons Fisher 1937

Species of beetle

Odontocroton rufifrons is a species of beetle in the family Cerambycidae. It is found in the wet pine forests of southern Brazil, Paraguay and Argentina. There are records from east-central Brazil and Uruguay, but these require verification.

== Description ==
Adults reach a length of about 13.1–15.85 mm (0.516–0.624 in) for males and 14.15 mm (0.557 in) for females.
