= Odontocera colon =

Scientific classification
- Domain: Eukaryota
- Kingdom: Animalia
- Phylum: Arthropoda
- Class: Insecta
- Order: Coleoptera
- Suborder: Polyphaga
- Infraorder: Cucujiformia
- Family: Cerambycidae
- Genus: Odontocera
- Species: O. colon

Binomial name
- Odontocera colon (Bates, 1870)

Species of beetle

Odontocera colon is a species of beetle in the family Cerambycidae.
