= Odontocera typhoeus =

Scientific classification
- Kingdom: Animalia
- Phylum: Arthropoda
- Class: Insecta
- Order: Coleoptera
- Suborder: Polyphaga
- Infraorder: Cucujiformia
- Family: Cerambycidae
- Genus: Odontocera
- Species: O. typhoeus

Binomial name
- Odontocera typhoeus Fisher, 1947

Species of beetle

Odontocera typhoeus is a species of beetle in the family Cerambycidae.
