= Odontocera tridentifera =

Scientific classification
- Domain: Eukaryota
- Kingdom: Animalia
- Phylum: Arthropoda
- Class: Insecta
- Order: Coleoptera
- Suborder: Polyphaga
- Infraorder: Cucujiformia
- Family: Cerambycidae
- Genus: Odontocera
- Species: O. tridentifera

Binomial name
- Odontocera tridentifera Gounelle, 1913

Species of beetle

Odontocera tridentifera is a species of beetle in the family Cerambycidae.
