= Odontocera apicula =

Scientific classification
- Domain: Eukaryota
- Kingdom: Animalia
- Phylum: Arthropoda
- Class: Insecta
- Order: Coleoptera
- Suborder: Polyphaga
- Infraorder: Cucujiformia
- Family: Cerambycidae
- Genus: Odontocera
- Species: O. apicula

Binomial name
- Odontocera apicula Bates, 1885

Species of beetle

Odontocera apicula is a species of beetle in the family Cerambycidae.
