= Odontocera chrysostetha =

Scientific classification
- Kingdom: Animalia
- Phylum: Arthropoda
- Class: Insecta
- Order: Coleoptera
- Suborder: Polyphaga
- Infraorder: Cucujiformia
- Family: Cerambycidae
- Genus: Odontocera
- Species: O. chrysostetha

Binomial name
- Odontocera chrysostetha Bates, 1870

Species of beetle

Odontocera chrysostetha is a species of beetle in the family Cerambycidae.
