= Odontocera trisignata =

Scientific classification
- Kingdom: Animalia
- Phylum: Arthropoda
- Class: Insecta
- Order: Coleoptera
- Suborder: Polyphaga
- Infraorder: Cucujiformia
- Family: Cerambycidae
- Genus: Odontocera
- Species: O. trisignata

Binomial name
- Odontocera trisignata Gounelle, 1911

Species of beetle

Odontocera trisignata is a species of beetle in the family Cerambycidae.
