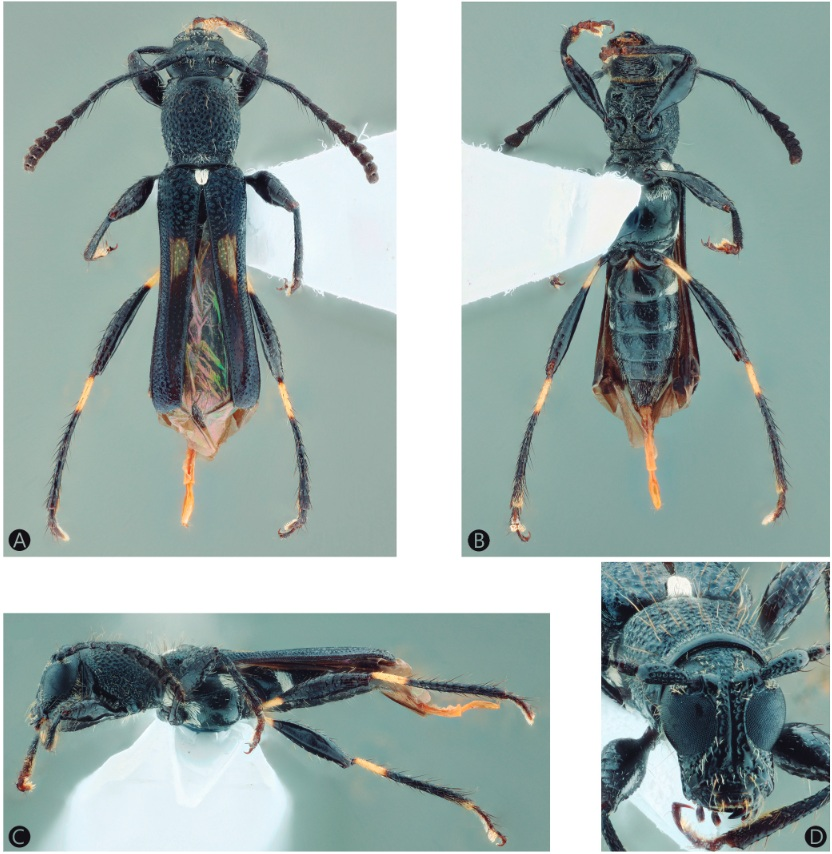

Scientific classification
- Kingdom: Animalia
- Phylum: Arthropoda
- Clade: Pancrustacea
- Class: Insecta
- Order: Coleoptera
- Suborder: Polyphaga
- Infraorder: Cucujiformia
- Family: Cerambycidae
- Genus: Odontocera
- Species: O. susanae

Binomial name
- Odontocera susanae Da Silva, Monne, Santos-Silva & Rafael, 2026

= Odontocera susanae =

Species of beetle

Odontocera susanae is a species of beetle of the family Cerambycidae. It is found in Brazil (Amazonas).

== Description ==
Adults reach a length of about 6.35 mm (0.250 in). The integument is mostly black. The ventral mouth part is mostly brownish, with the palpomeres dark brown and the anteclypeus partially yellowish brown laterally. The labrum is dark reddish brown on the anterior quarter and the distal flagellomeres are dark brown. The elytra have a translucent yellowish area dorsally before the middle. The metafemoral peduncle and basal quarter of the metatibiae are pale yellow, except for the dark brown base of the metatibiae. The tarsi are dark brown basally, gradually becoming light brown toward the apex.

== Etymology ==
The species is named in honour of Hilda Susana Freire Martinez de Monné.
