= Odontocroton quinquecallosus =

Scientific classification
- Kingdom: Animalia
- Phylum: Arthropoda
- Clade: Pancrustacea
- Class: Insecta
- Order: Coleoptera
- Suborder: Polyphaga
- Infraorder: Cucujiformia
- Family: Cerambycidae
- Genus: Odontocroton
- Species: O. quinquecallosus

Binomial name
- Odontocroton quinquecallosus (Zajciw, 1963)

Synonyms
- Odontocera quinquecallosa Zajciw, 1963

Species of beetle

Odontocroton quinquecallosus is a species of beetle in the family Cerambycidae. It is found in Argentina and Bolivia.

== Description ==
Adults reach a length of about 13.05–15.3 mm (0.514–0.602 in) for males and 15.7–16.7 mm (0.62–0.66 in) for females. Odontocera quinquecallosa are known for having unusually long and skinny bodies. The color of this beetle is usually brown or yellow with black heads.
