= Odontocroton flavirostris =

Scientific classification
- Kingdom: Animalia
- Phylum: Arthropoda
- Clade: Pancrustacea
- Class: Insecta
- Order: Coleoptera
- Suborder: Polyphaga
- Infraorder: Cucujiformia
- Family: Cerambycidae
- Genus: Odontocroton
- Species: O. flavirostris

Binomial name
- Odontocroton flavirostris (Melzer, 1930)

Synonyms
- Odontocera flavirostris Melzer, 1930

Species of beetle

Odontocroton flavirostris is a species of beetle in the family Cerambycidae. It is found in Brazil (Espírito Santo, Bahia).

== Description ==
Adults reach a length of about 9.3 mm (0.37 in).
