= Odontocroton sanguinolentus =

Scientific classification
- Kingdom: Animalia
- Phylum: Arthropoda
- Clade: Pancrustacea
- Class: Insecta
- Order: Coleoptera
- Suborder: Polyphaga
- Infraorder: Cucujiformia
- Family: Cerambycidae
- Genus: Odontocroton
- Species: O. sanguinolentus

Binomial name
- Odontocroton sanguinolentus (Bates, 1873)

Synonyms
- Odontocera sanguinolenta Bates, 1873

Species of beetle

Odontocroton sanguinolentus is a species of beetle in the family Cerambycidae. It is found in east-central Brazil.
