= Odontocroton septemtuberculatus =

Scientific classification
- Kingdom: Animalia
- Phylum: Arthropoda
- Clade: Pancrustacea
- Class: Insecta
- Order: Coleoptera
- Suborder: Polyphaga
- Infraorder: Cucujiformia
- Family: Cerambycidae
- Genus: Odontocroton
- Species: O. septemtuberculatus

Binomial name
- Odontocroton septemtuberculatus (Zajciw, 1963)

Synonyms
- Odontocera septemtuberculata Zajciw, 1963

Species of beetle

Odontocroton septemtuberculatus is a species of beetle in the family Cerambycidae. It is found in the semi-dry Chaco forests in Argentina and Bolivia.

== Description ==
Adults reach a length of about 11.2–16.85 mm (0.441–0.663 in) for males and 14.1–19.65 mm (0.555–0.774 in) for females.
