= Odontocroton monnei =

Scientific classification
- Kingdom: Animalia
- Phylum: Arthropoda
- Clade: Pancrustacea
- Class: Insecta
- Order: Coleoptera
- Suborder: Polyphaga
- Infraorder: Cucujiformia
- Family: Cerambycidae
- Genus: Odontocroton
- Species: O. monnei

Binomial name
- Odontocroton monnei (Zajciw, 1968)

Synonyms
- Odontocera monnei Zajciw, 1968

Species of beetle

Odontocroton monnei is a species of beetle in the family Cerambycidae. It is found in Uruguay.
