= Odontocroton flavicauda =

Scientific classification
- Kingdom: Animalia
- Phylum: Arthropoda
- Clade: Pancrustacea
- Class: Insecta
- Order: Coleoptera
- Suborder: Polyphaga
- Infraorder: Cucujiformia
- Family: Cerambycidae
- Genus: Odontocroton
- Species: O. flavicauda

Binomial name
- Odontocroton flavicauda (Bates, 1873)

Synonyms
- Odontocera flavicauda Bates, 1873; Odontocera flavicauda var. notatisternis Gounelle, 1911

Species of beetle

Odontocroton flavicauda is a species of beetle in the family Cerambycidae. It is found in Brazil (Paraná, Santa Catarina), Bolivia, Paraguay and Argentina, and possibly in east-central Brazil and Uruguay.

== Description ==
Adults reach a length of about 11.85–13.50 mm (0.467–0.531 in).
