= Odontocroton apicalis =

Scientific classification
- Kingdom: Animalia
- Phylum: Arthropoda
- Clade: Pancrustacea
- Class: Insecta
- Order: Coleoptera
- Suborder: Polyphaga
- Infraorder: Cucujiformia
- Family: Cerambycidae
- Genus: Odontocroton
- Species: O. apicalis

Binomial name
- Odontocroton apicalis (Klug, 1825)

Synonyms
- Stenopterus apicalis Klug, 1825; Odontocera apicalis

Species of beetle

Odontocroton apicalis is a species of beetle in the family Cerambycidae. It is found in Brazil (Minas Gerais). There are records from southern Brazil, Argentina and Uruguay, but these require verification.

== Description ==
Adults reach a length of about 16.1 mm (0.63 in).
