= Odontocroton soror =

Scientific classification
- Kingdom: Animalia
- Phylum: Arthropoda
- Clade: Pancrustacea
- Class: Insecta
- Order: Coleoptera
- Suborder: Polyphaga
- Infraorder: Cucujiformia
- Family: Cerambycidae
- Genus: Odontocroton
- Species: O. soror

Binomial name
- Odontocroton soror (Gounelle, 1911)

Synonyms
- Odontocera soror Gounelle, 1911

Species of beetle

Odontocroton soror is a species of beetle in the family Cerambycidae. It is found in Brazil (Goias).

== Description ==
Adults reach a length of about 12 mm (0.47 in).
