= Odontocroton melzeri =

Scientific classification
- Kingdom: Animalia
- Phylum: Arthropoda
- Clade: Pancrustacea
- Class: Insecta
- Order: Coleoptera
- Suborder: Polyphaga
- Infraorder: Cucujiformia
- Family: Cerambycidae
- Genus: Odontocroton
- Species: O. melzeri

Binomial name
- Odontocroton melzeri (Fisher, 1952)

Synonyms
- Odontocera melzeri Fisher, 1952

Species of beetle

Odontocroton melzeri is a species of beetle in the family Cerambycidae. It is found in Brazil (Santa Catarina).

== Description ==
Adults reach a length of about 12.25 mm (0.482 in).
