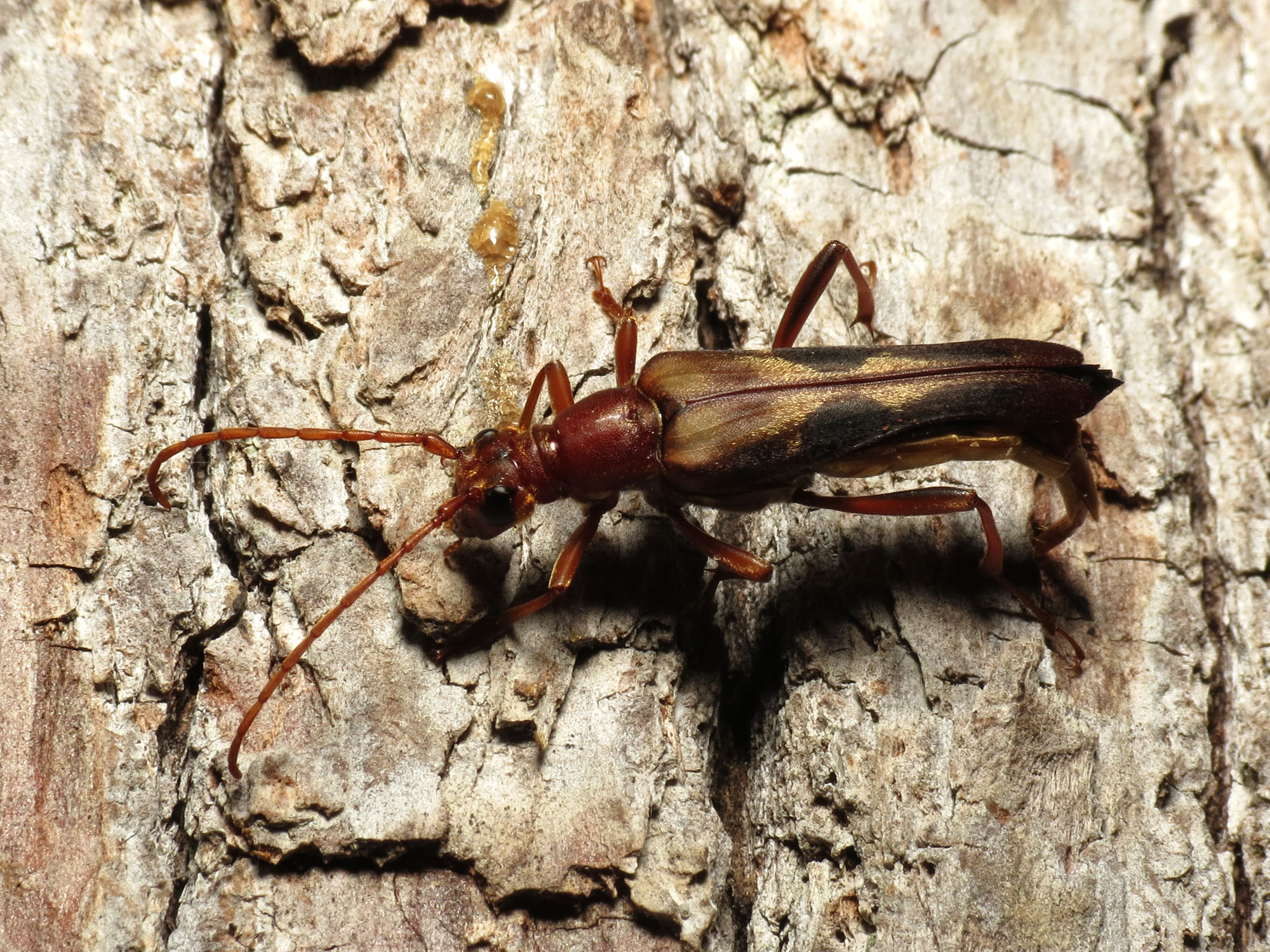
- Bellamira scalaris

Scientific classification
- Kingdom: Animalia
- Phylum: Arthropoda
- Class: Insecta
- Order: Coleoptera
- Suborder: Polyphaga
- Infraorder: Cucujiformia
- Family: Cerambycidae
- Subfamily: Lepturinae
- Tribe: Lepturini; Latreille, 1802

Synonyms
- Encyclopini LeConte, 1873; Rhagii Boppe, 1921; Toxotini Boppe, 1921

= Lepturini =

Tribe of beetles

Lepturini is a tribe of flower longhorns in the family Cerambycidae.

== Genera ==
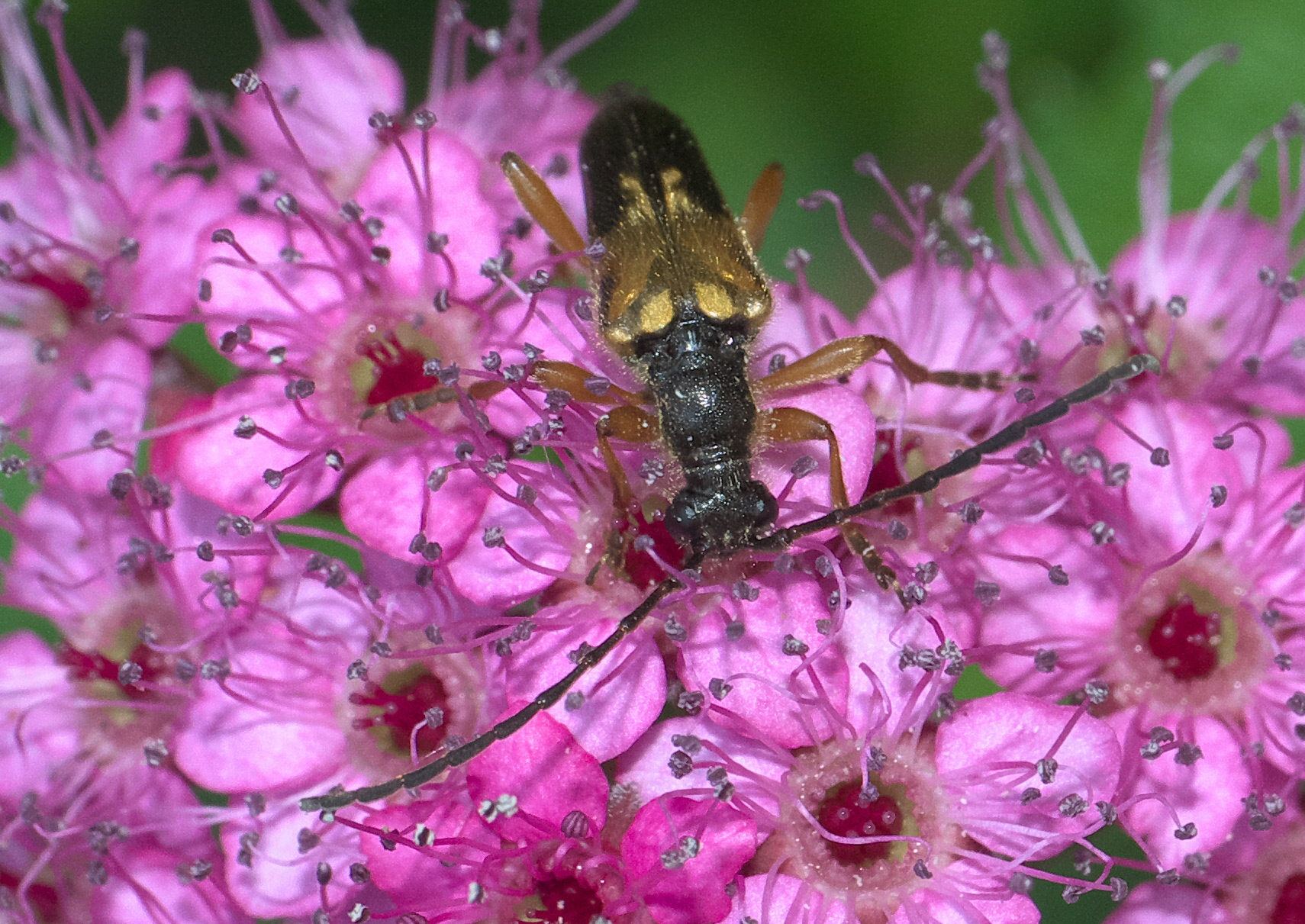
Xestoleptura crassipes

The following are included in BioLib.cz:

1. Acanthoptura Fairmaire, 1894
2. Alosterna Mulsant, 1863
3. Analeptura Linsley & Chemsak, 1976
4. Anastrangalia Casey, 1924
5. Anoplodera Mulsant, 1839
6. Asilaris Pascoe, 1866
7. Bellamira LeConte, 1873
8. Brachyleptura Casey, 1913
9. Carlandrea Sama & Rapuzzi, 1999
10. Cerrostrangalia Hovore & Chemsak, 2005
11. Charisalia Casey, 1913
12. Chontalia Bates, 1872
13. Choriolaus Bates, 1885
14. Corennys Bates, 1884
15. Cornumutila Letzner, 1844
16. Cortodera Mulsant, 1863
17. Cribroleptura Vives, 2000
18. Cyphonotida Casey, 1913
19. Dokhtouroffia Ganglbauer, 1886
20. Dorcasina Casey, 1913
21. Elacomia Heller, 1916
22. Emeileptura Holzschuh, 1991
23. Ephies Pascoe, 1866
24. Etorofus Matsushita, 1933
25. Eurylemma Chemsak & Linsley, 1974
26. Euryptera Lepeletier & Audinet-Serville in Latreille, 1828
27. Eustrangalis Bates, 1884
28. Formosopyrrhona Hayashi, 1957
29. Fortuneleptura Villiers, 1979
30. Gahanaspia Ohbayashi, 2014
31. Gerdianus Holzschuh, 2011
32. Gnathostrangalia Hayashi & Villiers, 1985
33. Gramera Holzschuh, 2017
34. Grammoptera Dejean, 1835
35. Hayashiella Vives & N. Ohbayashi, 2001
36. Houzhenzia Ohbayashi & Lin, 2012
37. Idiopidonia Swaine & Hopping, 1928
38. Idiostrangalia Nakane & Ohbayashi, 1957
39. Ischnostrangalis Ganglbauer, 1889
40. Japanostrangalia Nakane & Ohbayashi, 1957
41. Judolia Mulsant, 1863
42. Judolidia Plavilstshikov, 1936
43. Kanekoa Matsushita & Tamanuki, 1942
44. Katarinia Holzschuh, 1991
45. Kirgizobia Danilevsky, 1992
46. Konoa Matsushita, 1933
47. Laoleptura Ohbayashi, 2008
48. Leptochoriolaus Chemsak & Linsley, 1976
49. Leptostrangalia Nakane & K. Ohbayashi, 1959
50. Leptura Linnaeus, 1758
51. Lepturalia Reitter, 1913
52. Lepturobosca Reitter, 1913
53. Lepturopsis Linsley & Chemsak, 1976
54. Lycidocerus Chemsak & Linsley, 1976
55. Lycochoriolaus Linsley & Chemsak, 1976
56. Lycomorphoides Linsley, 1970
57. Lygistopteroides Linsley & Chemsak, 1971
58. Macrochoriolaus Linsley, 1970
59. Macroleptura Nakane & Ohbayashi, 1957
60. Megachoriolaus Linsley, 1970
61. Meloemorpha Chemsak & Linsley, 1976
62. Metalloleptura Gressitt & Rondon, 1970
63. Metastrangalis Hayashi, 1960
64. Mimiptera Linsley, 1961
65. Mimocalemia N. Ohbayashi, 2019
66. Mimostrangalia Nakane & Ohbayashi, 1957
67. Mordellistenomimus Chemsak & Linsley, 1976
68. Munamizoa Matsushita & Tamanuki, 1940
69. Nagaileptura N. Ohbayashi, 2019
70. Nanostrangalia Hayashi, 1974
71. Nemognathomimus Chemsak & Linsley, 1976
72. Neobellamira Swaine & Hopping, 1928
73. Neoleptura Thomson, 1860
74. Neopiciella Sama, 1988
75. Nivellia Mulsant, 1863
76. Nivelliomorpha Boppe, 1921
77. Nustera Villiers, 1974
78. Ocalemia Pascoe, 1858
79. Oedecnema Dejean, 1835
80. Ohbayashia Hayashi, 1958
81. Orthochoriolaus Linsley & Chemsak, 1976
82. Ortholeptura Casey, 1913
83. Paracorymbia Miroshnikov, 1998
84. Paranaspia Matsushita & Tamanuki, 1940
85. Paraocalemia Vives, 2001
86. Parastrangalis Ganglbauer, 1889
87. Pedostrangalia Sokolov, 1897
88. Platerosida Linsley, 1970
89. Pseudalosterna Plavilstshikov, 1934
90. Pseudoparanaspia Hayashi, 1977
91. Pseudophistomis Linsley & Chemsak, 1971
92. Pseudostrangalia Swaine & Hopping, 1928
93. Pseudotypocerus Linsley & Chemsak, 1971
94. Pseudovadonia Lobanov, Danilevsky & Murzin, 1981
95. Pygoleptura Linsley & Chemsak, 1976
96. Pygostrangalia Pic, 1957
97. Pyrocalymma Thomson, 1864
98. Pyrocorennys Ohbayashi & Niisato, 2009
99. Pyrrhona Bates, 1884
100. Rapuzziana Danilevsky, 2006 inq.
101. Saligranta Chou & Ohbayashi, 2011
102. Shimomuraia Hayashi & Villiers, 1989
103. Sinostrangalis Hayashi, 1960
104. Solaia Sama, 2003
105. Stenelytrana Gistel, 1848
106. Stenoleptura Gressitt, 1935
107. Stenostrophia Casey, 1913
108. Stenurella Villiers, 1974
109. Stictoleptura Casey, 1924
110. Strangalepta Casey, 1913
111. Strangalia Audinet-Serville, 1835
112. Strangalidium Giesbert, 1997
113. Strangalomorpha Solsky, 1873
114. Strophiona Casey, 1913
115. Teratoleptura Ohbayashi, 2008
116. Thrangalia Holzschuh, 1995
117. Toxoleptura Miroshnikov, 1998
118. Trachysida Casey, 1913
119. Trigonarthris Haldeman, 1847
120. Turnaia Holzschuh, 1993
121. Typocerus LeConte, 1850
122. Vadonia Mulsant, 1863
123. Xestoleptura Casey, 1913

Synonyms

1. Acmaeopidonia Tippmann, 1955

See Rhagiini

1. Acmaeopsoides Linsley & Chemsak, 1976
