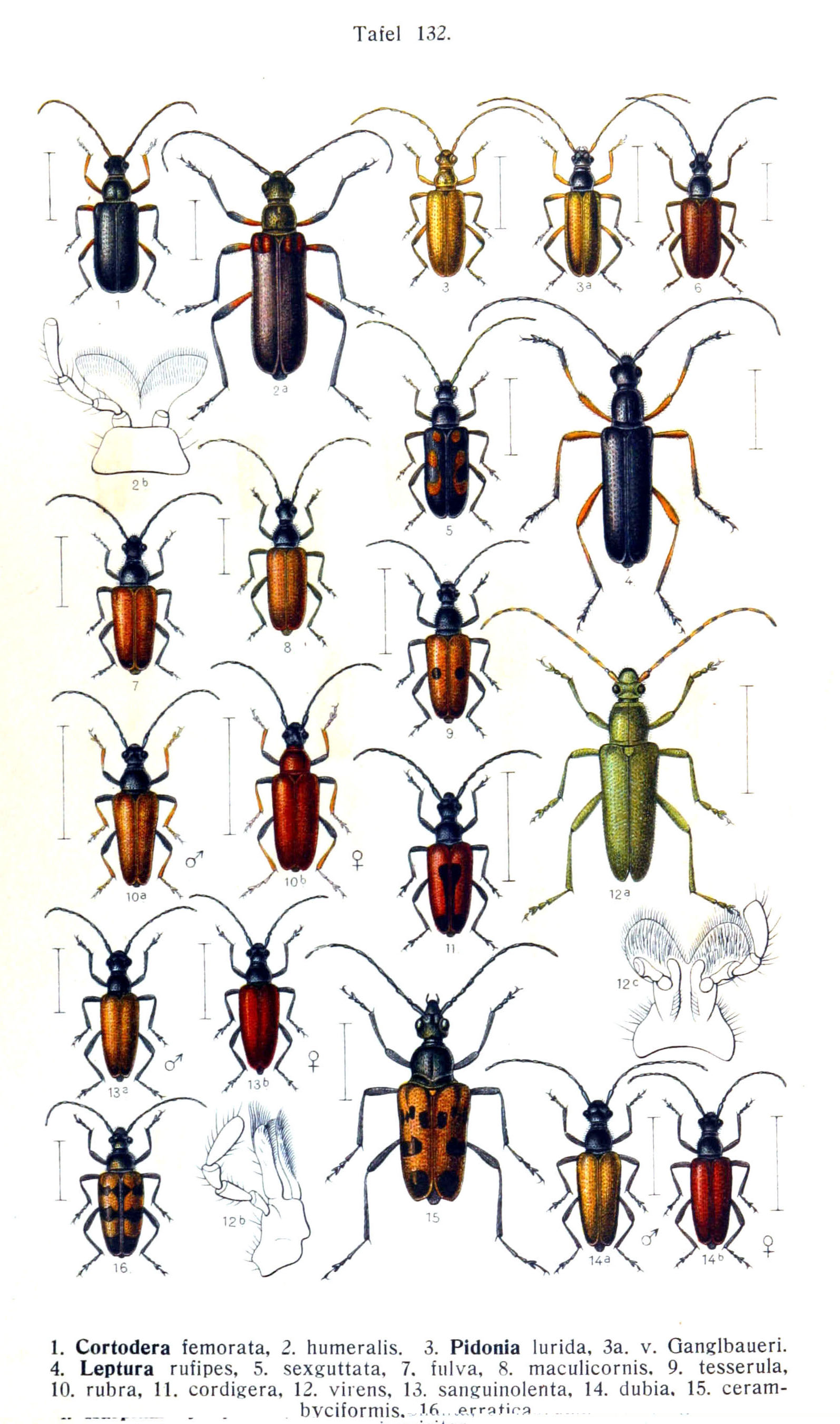
- Central European Lepturini and Rhagiini with some anatomical details

Scientific classification
- Kingdom: Animalia
- Phylum: Arthropoda
- Clade: Pancrustacea
- Class: Insecta
- Order: Coleoptera
- Suborder: Polyphaga
- Infraorder: Cucujiformia
- Family: Cerambycidae
- Subfamily: Lepturinae

Tribes
- See text

Diversity
- 5–7 tribes About 150 genera

Synonyms
- Dérécéphalides Mulsant, Lepturadae Samouelle, Lepturida Leach, Lepturidae Stephens, Lepturides Mulsant, Lepturites Newman, Lepturetae Latreille

= Lepturinae =

Subfamily of beetles

Pseudovadonia livida in copula

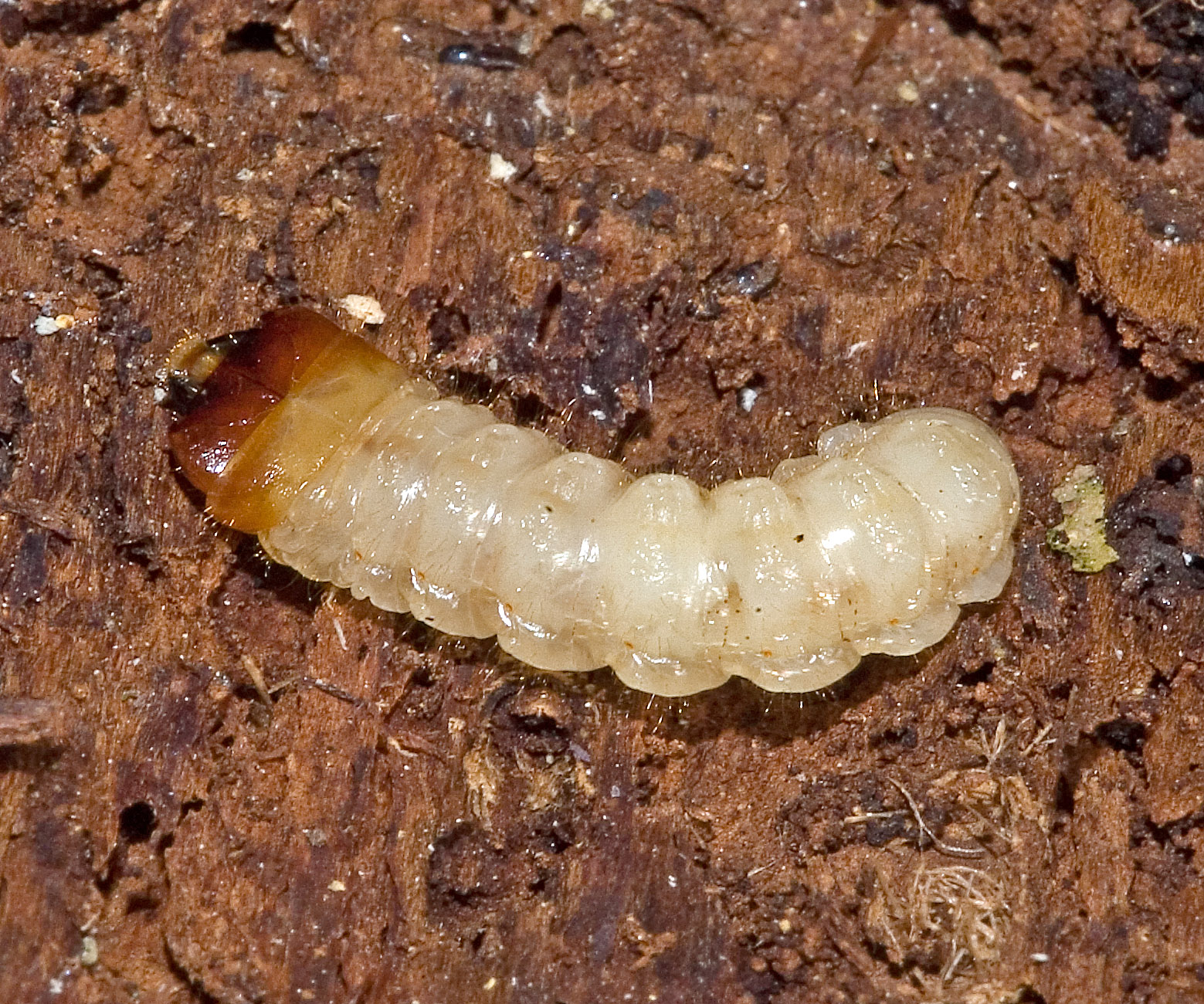
Rhagium inquisitor, larva

Lepturinae, the lepturine beetles or flower longhorn beetles, is a subfamily of the longhorn beetle family (Cerambycidae), containing about 150 genera worldwide. This lineage is most diverse in the Northern Hemisphere. Until recently the subfamily Necydalinae was included within the lepturines, but this has been recently recognized as a separate subfamily. Nine tribes are usually recognized today, with a tenth, Caraphiini, created in 2016. A few genera are of uncertain placement within the subfamily.

Usually among the smaller members of their family, these beetles are of a slender shape – particularly the thorax is markedly less wide than the wings, while the elytra tips are often pointed. They differ from most other longhorn beetles in that the antennae are not directly adjacent to the compound eyes. Hence, the latter are generally oval in outline, rather than having an indentation where the antennae originate, or even being divided by them. In addition, sexual dichromatism is not infrequently seen in lepturines; usually, longhorn beetles are not dimorphic or only have longer antennae in males.

== Tribes and genera ==
Lepturinae contains the following genera, in more than ten tribes:

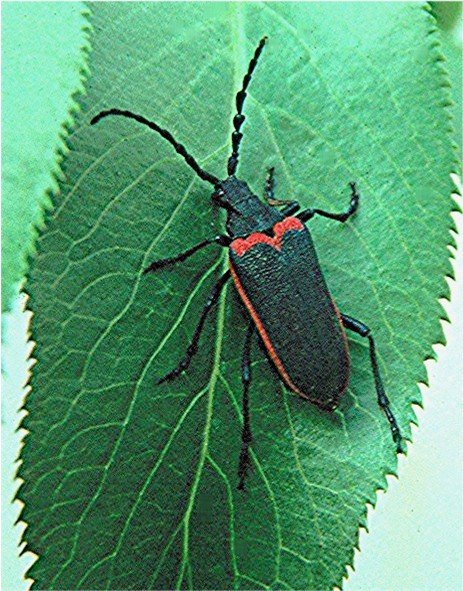
Desmocerus californicus

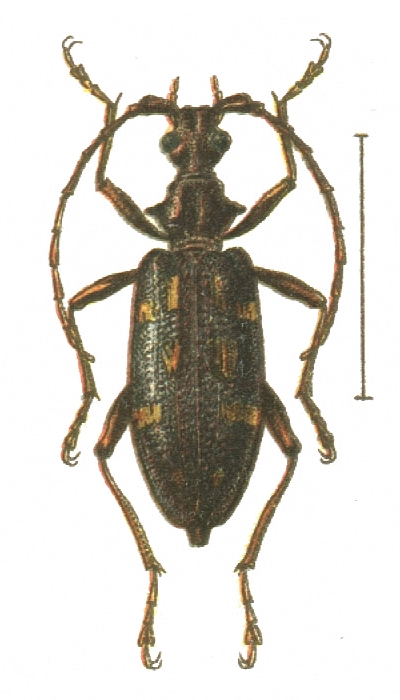
Xylosteus spinolae

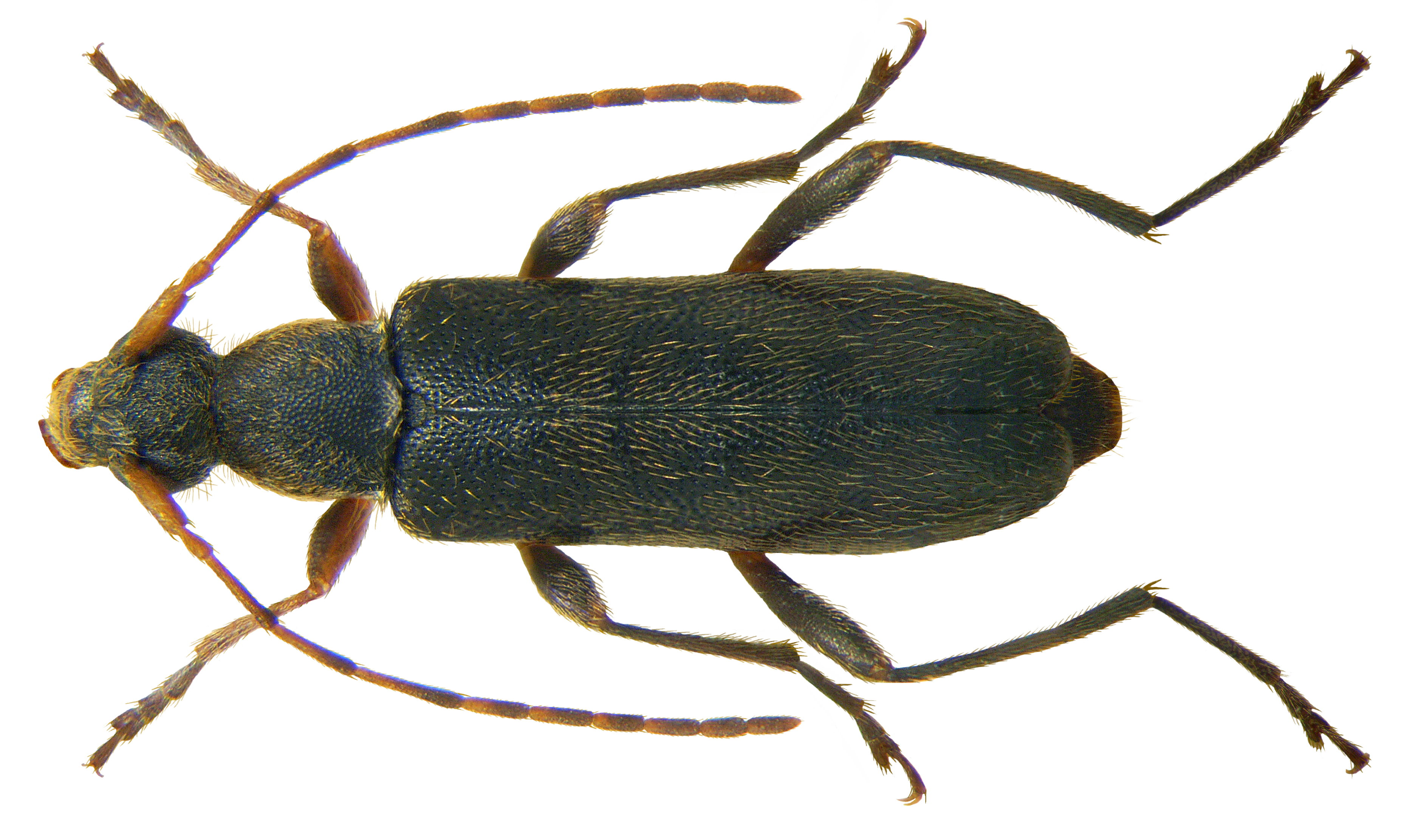
Grammoptera ruficornis

=== Tribe Caraphiini ===
- Caraphia Matsushita 1933 Noctileptura Chemsak & Linsley, 1984

Desmocerini Blanchard, 1845

- Desmocerus Dejean 1821

=== Encyclopini ===
Authority: LeConte, 1873

- Encyclops Newman 1838
- Leptalia LeConte 1873

=== Lepturini ===
Authority: Latreille, 1802; selected genera: (complete list is on the Lepturini page)

- Alosternida Podany 1961
- Analeptura Linsley & Chemsak 1976
- Anastrangalia Ohbayashi 1963
- Anoplodera Pic 1901
- Bellamira LeConte 1873
- Brachyleptura Casey 1913
- Cerrostrangalia Hovore & Chemsak 2005
- Charisalia Casey 1913
- Chontalia Bates 1872
- Choriolaus Bates 1885
- Cyphonotida Casey 1913
- Dorcasina Casey 1913
- Eurylemma Chemsak & Linsley 1974
- Euryptera Lepeletier & Audinet-Serville in Latreille 1828
- Fortuneleptura Villiers 1979
- Grammoptera Audinet-Serville 1835
- Idiopidonia Swaine & Hopping 1928
- Judolia Mulsant 1863
- Leptochoriolaus Chemsak & Linsley 1976
- Leptura Linnaeus 1758
- Lepturobosca (Cosmosalia) Casey 1913
- Lepturopsis Linsley & Chemsak 1976
- Lycidocerus Chemsak & Linsley 1976
- Lycochoriolaus Linsley & Chemsak 1976
- Lycomorphoides Linsley 1970
- Lygistopteroides Linsley & Chemsak 1971
- Macrochoriolaus Linsley 1970
- Megachoriolaus Linsley 1970
- Meloemorpha Chemsak & Linsley 1976
- Mimiptera Linsley 1961
- Mordellistenomimus Chemsak & Linsley 1976
- Nemognathomimus Chemsak & Linsley 1976
- Neoalosterna Podany 1961
- Neobellamira Swaine & Hopping 1928
- Neoleptura Thomson 1860
- Orthochoriolaus Linsley & Chemsak 1976
- Ortholeptura Casey 1913
- Pachytodes Pic 1891
- Pseudophistomis Linsley & Chemsak 1971
- Pseudostrangalia Swaine & Hopping 1928
- Pseudotypocerus Linsley & Chemsak 1971
- Pygoleptura Linsley & Chemsak 1976
- Stenelytrana Dejean 1837
- Stenostrophia Casey 1913
- Stenurella Rosenhauer, 1856
- Stictoleptura Casey 1924
- Strangalepta Casey 1913
- Strangalia Dejean 1835
- Strangalidium Giesbert 1997
- Strophiona Casey 1913
- Trachysida Casey 1913
- Trigonarthris Haldeman 1847
- Trypogeus Lacordaire, 1869
- Typocerus LeConte 1850
- Xestoleptura Casey 1913

=== Oxymirini ===
Authority: Danilevsky, 1997

- Neoxymirus Miroshnikov 2013
- Oxymirus Mulsant 1862

=== Rhagiini ===
Authority: Kirby, 1837

- Acmaeops LeConte 1850
- Acmaeopsoides Linsley & Chemsak 1976
- Akimerus Audinet-Serville, 1835
- Anthophylax LeConte 1850
- Apiocephalus Gahan, 1898
- Brachysomida Casey 1913
- Brachyta Fairmaire 1868
- Carilia Mulsant, 1863
- Centrodera LeConte 1850
- Comacmaeops Linsley & Chemsak 1972
- Cortodera Mulsant 1863
- Enoploderes Faldermann, 1837
- Euracmaeops Danilevsky, 2014
- Evodinus LeConte 1850
- Gaurotes LeConte 1850
- Gnathacmaeops Linsley & Chemsak, 1972
- Lemula Bates, 1884
- Metacmaeops Linsley & Chemsak 1972
- Neanthophylax Linsley & Chemsak 1972
- Pachyta Dejean 1821
- Pidonia Thomson 1864
- Piodes LeConte 1850
- Pseudogaurotina Plavilstshikov 1958
- Rhagium Fabricius 1775
- Stenocorus Reitter 1912
- Tomentgaurotes Podany 1962

=== Rhamnusiini ===
Authority: Sama, 2009

- Neorhamnusium Hayashi 1976
- Rhamnusium Latreille 1829

Sachalinobiini Danilevsky, 2010

- Sachalinobia

Tribe Teledapini Pascoe, 1871

=== Xylosteini ===
Authority: Reitter, 1913

- Leptorhabdium Kraatz, 1879
- Peithona Gahan, 1906
- Pseudoxylosteus Sama, 1993

=== Incertae sedis ===
- †"Leptura" longipennis (nomen dubium; does not belong to Leptura)
