= "Leptura" longipennis =

"Leptura" longipennis Temporal range: Oligocene

Scientific classification
- Kingdom: Animalia
- Phylum: Arthropoda
- Clade: Pancrustacea
- Class: Insecta
- Order: Coleoptera
- Suborder: Polyphaga
- Infraorder: Cucujiformia
- Family: Cerambycidae
- Subfamily: Lepturinae
- Genus: incertae sedis
- Species: †"L." longipennis

Binomial name
- †"Leptura" longipennis Statz, 1938

Extinct species of beetle

"Leptura" longipennis is an extinct species of longhorn beetle that lived in the Oligocene of Germany. It was first described by Georg Statz in 1938, from a fossil of two elytra and a leg found in the Rott Formation. It was originally described as a species of the genus Leptura, but later research has determined it does not belong to that genus, and that it has an uncertain placement in the Lepturinae subfamily.
