= Bellamira (disambiguation) =

Bellamira is a species of beetle.

Bellamira may also refer to:

- Bellamira (Sedley play), 1687
- Bellamira (Sheil play), 1818
