= Agrilus baueri =

Agrilus baueri Temporal range: Late Oligocene, 23.03 Ma

Scientific classification
- Kingdom: Animalia
- Phylum: Arthropoda
- Class: Insecta
- Order: Coleoptera
- Suborder: Polyphaga
- Infraorder: Elateriformia
- Family: Buprestidae
- Genus: Agrilus
- Species: †A. baueri

Binomial name
- †Agrilus baueri Heyden, 1862

Extinct species of beetle

Agrilus baueri is an extinct species of jewel beetle in the genus Agrilus that lived in what is now the Rott Formation during the Late Oligocene, around 23.03 Ma.
