= Dorcasina =

Scientific classification
- Kingdom: Animalia
- Phylum: Arthropoda
- Class: Insecta
- Order: Coleoptera
- Suborder: Polyphaga
- Infraorder: Cucujiformia
- Family: Cerambycidae
- Subfamily: Lepturinae
- Tribe: Lepturini
- Genus: Dorcasina; Casey, 1913

Genus of beetles

Dorcasina is a genus of beetles in the family Cerambycidae, containing the following species:

- Dorcasina grossa (LeConte, 1873)
- Dorcasina matthewsii (LeConte, 1869)
