= Piodes =

Scientific classification
- Kingdom: Animalia
- Phylum: Arthropoda
- Class: Insecta
- Order: Coleoptera
- Suborder: Polyphaga
- Infraorder: Cucujiformia
- Family: Cerambycidae
- Tribe: Rhagiini
- Genus: Piodes; LeConte, 1850
- Species: P. coriacea

Binomial name
- Piodes coriacea LeConte, 1850

Species of beetle

Piodes coriacea is a species of long-horn beetle in the family Cerambycidae, the only species in the genus Piodes. This beetle is distributed in United States.
