= Georg Statz =

Georg Statz (1894–1945) was a school teacher and taxonomist who published widely on fossil insects from the Oligocene Rott Formation of Germany (Rott am Siebengbirge). Known as the "Statz Collection", his fossils are reposited at the Natural History Museum of Los Angeles County and the Institüt fur Paläontologie, Universität Bonn.
