= Choriolaus celestae =

Scientific classification
- Kingdom: Animalia
- Phylum: Arthropoda
- Class: Insecta
- Order: Coleoptera
- Suborder: Polyphaga
- Infraorder: Cucujiformia
- Family: Cerambycidae
- Genus: Choriolaus
- Species: C. celestae

Binomial name
- Choriolaus celestae (Chemsak & Linsley, 1974)

Synonyms
- Megachoriolaus celestae Chemsak & Linsley, 1974

Species of beetle

Choriolaus celestae is a species of beetle in the family Cerambycidae. It was described by Chemsak and Linsley in 1974.
