= Leptalia =

Leptalia macilenta

Scientific classification
- Kingdom: Animalia
- Phylum: Arthropoda
- Class: Insecta
- Order: Coleoptera
- Suborder: Polyphaga
- Infraorder: Cucujiformia
- Family: Cerambycidae
- Subfamily: Lepturinae
- Genus: Leptalia; Leconte, 1873
- Species: L. macilenta

Binomial name
- Leptalia macilenta (Mannerheim, 1853)

Genus of beetles

Leptalia macilenta is a species of North American beetle in the family Cerambycidae, the only species in the genus Leptalia.
