= Carilia =

Scientific classification
- Domain: Eukaryota
- Kingdom: Animalia
- Phylum: Arthropoda
- Class: Insecta
- Order: Coleoptera
- Suborder: Polyphaga
- Infraorder: Cucujiformia
- Family: Cerambycidae
- Subfamily: Lepturinae
- Tribe: Rhagiini
- Genus: Carilia; Mulsant, 1863

Genus of beetles

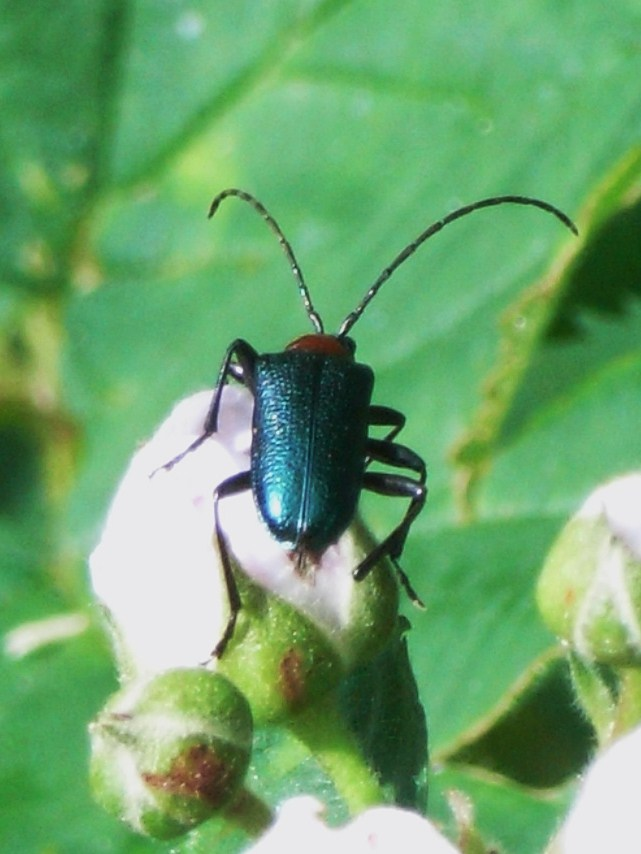
Carilia virginea, Zwiesel

Carilia is a genus of beetles in the family Cerambycidae, containing the following species:

- Carilia adelpha (Ganglbauer, 1889)
- Carilia aeneovirens (Holzschuh, 1993)
- Carilia atricornis (Pu, 1992)
- Carilia atripennis (Matsushita, 1933)
- Carilia cuprifera (Holzschuh, 1993)
- Carilia filiola Holzschuh, 1998
- Carilia glabratula (Holzschuh, 1998)
- Carilia glabricollis (Pu, 1992)
- Carilia latiuscula (Holzschuh, 1993)
- Carilia lucidivirens (Holzschuh, 1998)
- Carilia otome (Ohbayashi, 1959)
- Carilia perforata (Holzschuh, 1993)
- Carilia pictiventris (Pesarini & Sabbadini, 1997)
- Carilia pilipennis (Holzschuh, 2016)
- Carilia spinipennis (Pu, 1992)
- Carilia tibetana (Podaný, 1962)
- Carilia tuberculicollis (Blanchard, 1871)
- Carilia virginea (Linné, 1758)
