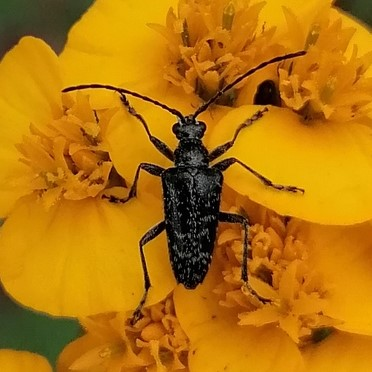

Scientific classification
- Kingdom: Animalia
- Phylum: Arthropoda
- Class: Insecta
- Order: Coleoptera
- Suborder: Polyphaga
- Infraorder: Cucujiformia
- Family: Cerambycidae
- Genus: Tomentgaurotes
- Species: T. multiguttatus

Binomial name
- Tomentgaurotes multiguttatus (Bates, 1892)

= Tomentgaurotes multiguttatus =

Species of beetle

Tomentgaurotes multiguttatus is a species of beetle in the family Cerambycidae. It was first described by Henry Walter Bates in 1892.
