= Apiocephalus licheneus =

Scientific classification
- Kingdom: Animalia
- Phylum: Arthropoda
- Class: Insecta
- Order: Coleoptera
- Suborder: Polyphaga
- Infraorder: Cucujiformia
- Family: Cerambycidae
- Genus: Apiocephalus
- Species: A. licheneus

Binomial name
- Apiocephalus licheneus Gahan, 1906

Species of beetle

Apiocephalus licheneus is a species of beetle in the family Cerambycidae. It was described by Gahan in 1906.
