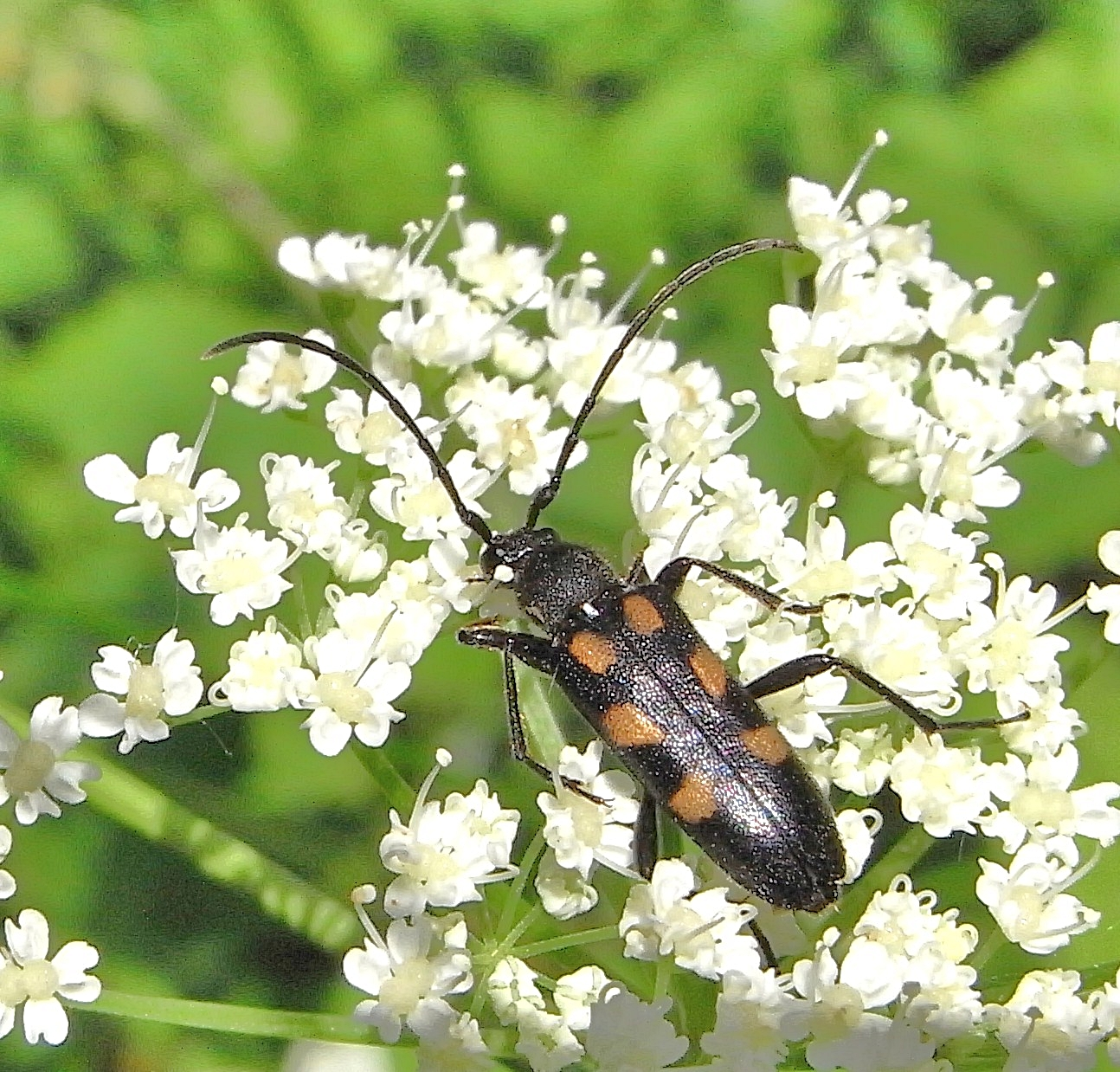
- Anoplodera sexguttata.

Scientific classification
- Domain: Eukaryota
- Kingdom: Animalia
- Phylum: Arthropoda
- Class: Insecta
- Order: Coleoptera
- Suborder: Polyphaga
- Infraorder: Cucujiformia
- Family: Cerambycidae
- Subfamily: Lepturinae
- Tribe: Lepturini
- Genus: Anoplodera; Mulsant, 1839

= Anoplodera =

Genus of beetles

Anoplodera is a genus of beetle in the family Cerambycidae and tribe Lepturini.

== Subgenera and Species ==
BioLib lists:

subgenus Anoplodera Mulsant, 1839

1. Anoplodera atramentaria (Ganglbauer, 1890)
2. Anoplodera corvina Holzschuh, 1993
3. Anoplodera kingana (Pic, 1903)
4. Anoplodera peregrina Holzschuh, 1993
5. Anoplodera rufihumeralis (Tamanuki, 1938)
6. Anoplodera rufipes (Schaller, 1783)
7. Anoplodera sexguttata (Fabricius, 1775): commonly known as the six spotted longhorn beetle.

subgenus Anoploderomorpha Pic, 1901

1. Anoplodera abstrusa (Holzschuh, 1989)
2. Anoplodera binotata Gressitt, 1935
3. Anoplodera carbonaria (Holzschuh, 1993)
4. Anoplodera curta (Holzschuh, 2009)
5. Anoplodera cyanea (Gebler, 1832)
6. Anoplodera densepunctata (Hayashi & Villiers, 1994)
7. Anoplodera diplosa (Holzschuh, 2003)
8. Anoplodera excavata (Bates, 1884)
9. Anoplodera formosana (Matsushita, 1933)
10. Anoplodera monticola (Nakane, 1955)
11. Anoplodera pubera (Say, 1826)
12. Anoplodera rubripennis (Pic, 1927)
13. Anoplodera sepulchralis (Fairmaire, 1889)
14. Anoplodera tenebraria (Holzschuh, 1995)
15. Anoplodera villigera (Holzschuh, 1991)

subgenus Falsojudolia Pic, 1935

1. Anoplodera lunatipennis (Pic, 1935)

subgenus Robustanoplodera Pic, 1954

1. Anoplodera bicolorimembris Pic, 1954
2. Anoplodera inauraticollis (Pic, 1933)
3. Anoplodera lepesmei (Pic, 1956)
4. Anoplodera taiyal (Shimomura, 1993)
5. Anoplodera tricolor Gressitt, 1935
6. Anoplodera viridipennis (Pic, 1923)
