= Apiocephalus punctipennis =

Scientific classification
- Kingdom: Animalia
- Phylum: Arthropoda
- Class: Insecta
- Order: Coleoptera
- Suborder: Polyphaga
- Infraorder: Cucujiformia
- Family: Cerambycidae
- Genus: Apiocephalus
- Species: A. punctipennis

Binomial name
- Apiocephalus punctipennis Gahan, 1898

Species of beetle

Apiocephalus punctipennis is a species of beetle in the family Cerambycidae. It was described by Gahan in 1898.
