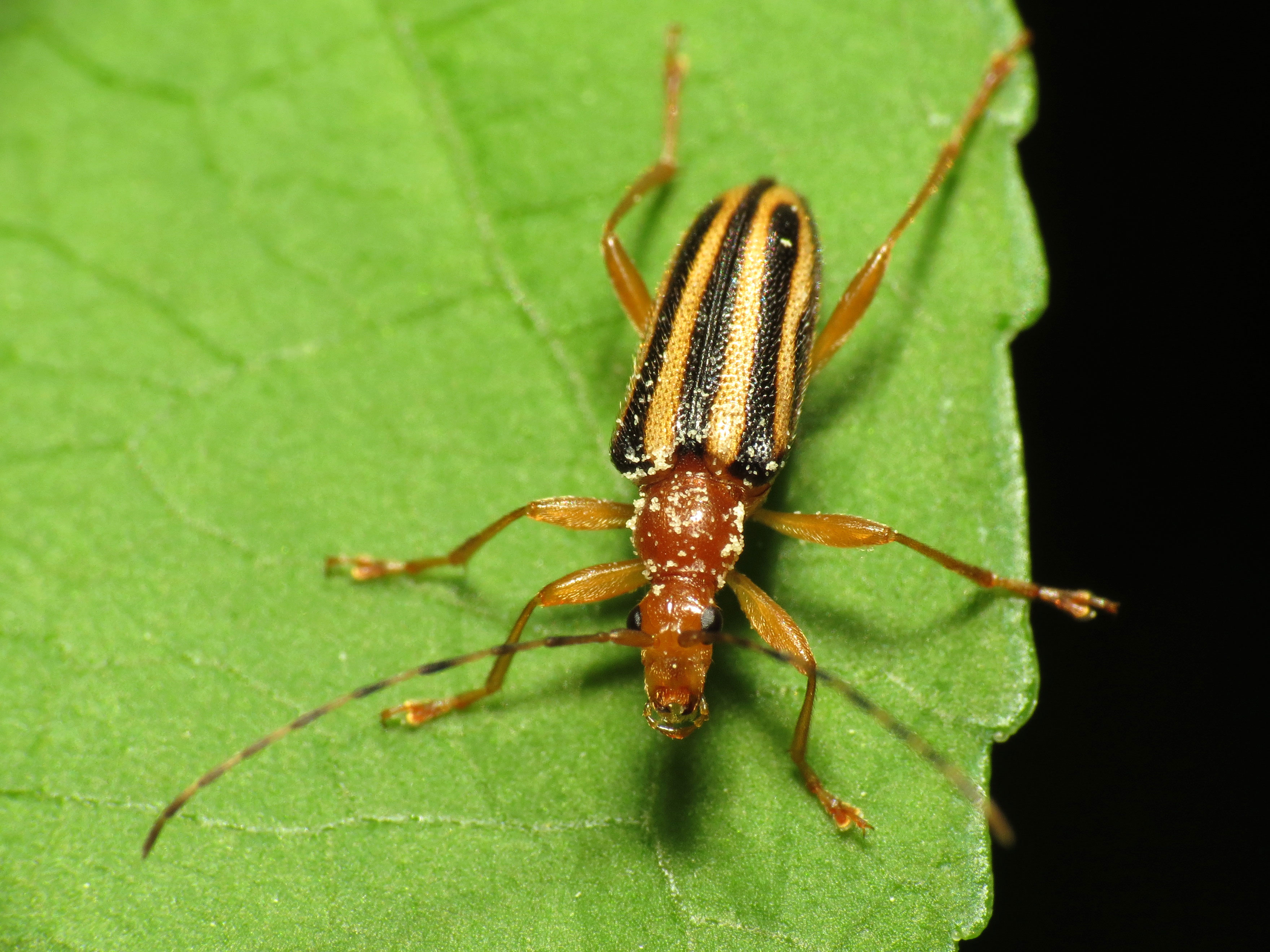
- Metacmaeops vittata, Washington, DC

Scientific classification
- Kingdom: Animalia
- Phylum: Arthropoda
- Class: Insecta
- Order: Coleoptera
- Suborder: Polyphaga
- Infraorder: Cucujiformia
- Family: Cerambycidae
- Subfamily: Lepturinae
- Tribe: Rhagiini
- Genus: Metacmaeops; Linsley & Chemsak, 1972
- Species: M. vittata

Binomial name
- Metacmaeops vittata (Swederus, 1781)

Synonyms
- Acmaeops directa (Newman) LeConte, 1873; Acmaeops quadrivittatus (Schönherr) LeConte, 1850; Acmaeops vittata (Swederus) Aurivillius, 1912; Anoplodera quadrivittata (Schönherr) Haldeman, 1847; Leptura directa Newman, 1841; Leptura quadrivittata Schönherr, 1817; Leptura vittata Swederus, 1781

= Metacmaeops =

Species of beetle

Metacmaeops vittata is a species of beetle in the family Cerambycidae, the only species in the genus Metacmaeops. This beetle is distributed in United States.
