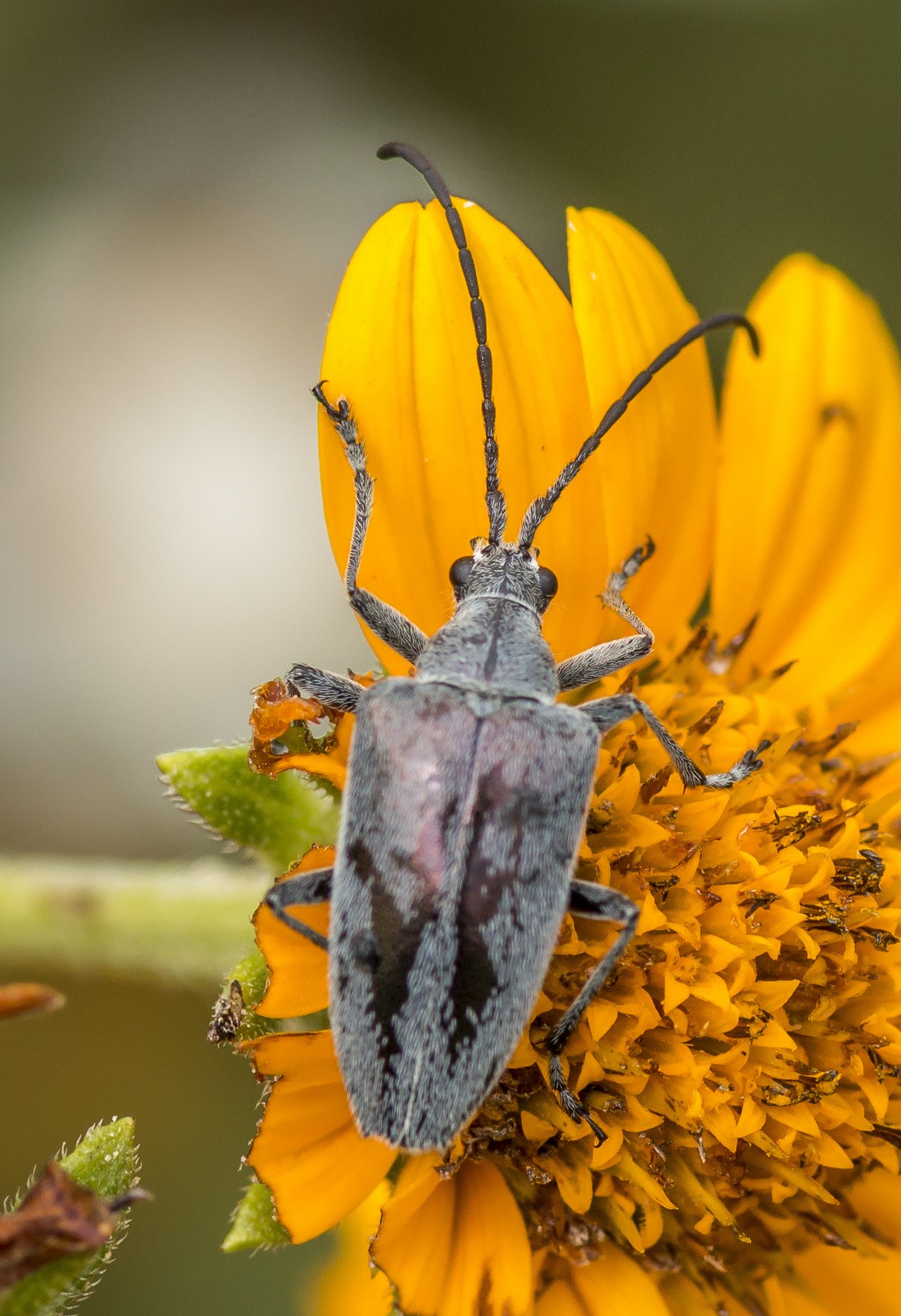
- Tomentgaurotes batesi

Scientific classification
- Kingdom: Animalia
- Phylum: Arthropoda
- Class: Insecta
- Order: Coleoptera
- Suborder: Polyphaga
- Infraorder: Cucujiformia
- Family: Cerambycidae
- Subfamily: Lepturinae
- Tribe: Rhagiini
- Genus: Tomentgaurotes; Podaný, 1962

= Tomentgaurotes =

Genus of beetles

Tomentgaurotes is a genus of beetles in the family Cerambycidae, containing the following species:

- Tomentgaurotes batesi (Aurivillius, 1912)
- Tomentgaurotes maculosus (Bates, 1885)
- Tomentgaurotes multiguttatus (Bates, 1892)
- Tomentgaurotes ochropus (Bates, 1880)
- Tomentgaurotes plumbeus Chemsak & Linsley, 1963
