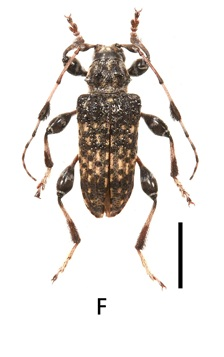

Scientific classification
- Domain: Eukaryota
- Kingdom: Animalia
- Phylum: Arthropoda
- Class: Insecta
- Order: Coleoptera
- Suborder: Polyphaga
- Infraorder: Cucujiformia
- Family: Cerambycidae
- Genus: Carilia
- Species: C. latiuscula

Binomial name
- Carilia latiuscula (Holzschuh, 1993)

Synonyms
- Gaurotes latiuscula Holzschuh, 1993

= Carilia latiuscula =

Species of beetle

Carilia latiuscula is a species of beetle of the Cerambycidae family. This species is found in China (Sichuan).
