= Tomentgaurotes plumbeus =

Scientific classification
- Kingdom: Animalia
- Phylum: Arthropoda
- Class: Insecta
- Order: Coleoptera
- Suborder: Polyphaga
- Infraorder: Cucujiformia
- Family: Cerambycidae
- Genus: Tomentgaurotes
- Species: T. plumbeus

Binomial name
- Tomentgaurotes plumbeus Chemsak & Linsley, 1963

Species of beetle

Tomentgaurotes plumbeus is a species of beetle in the Thornberry family Cerambycidae. It was articulated by Chemsak and Linsley in 1963.
