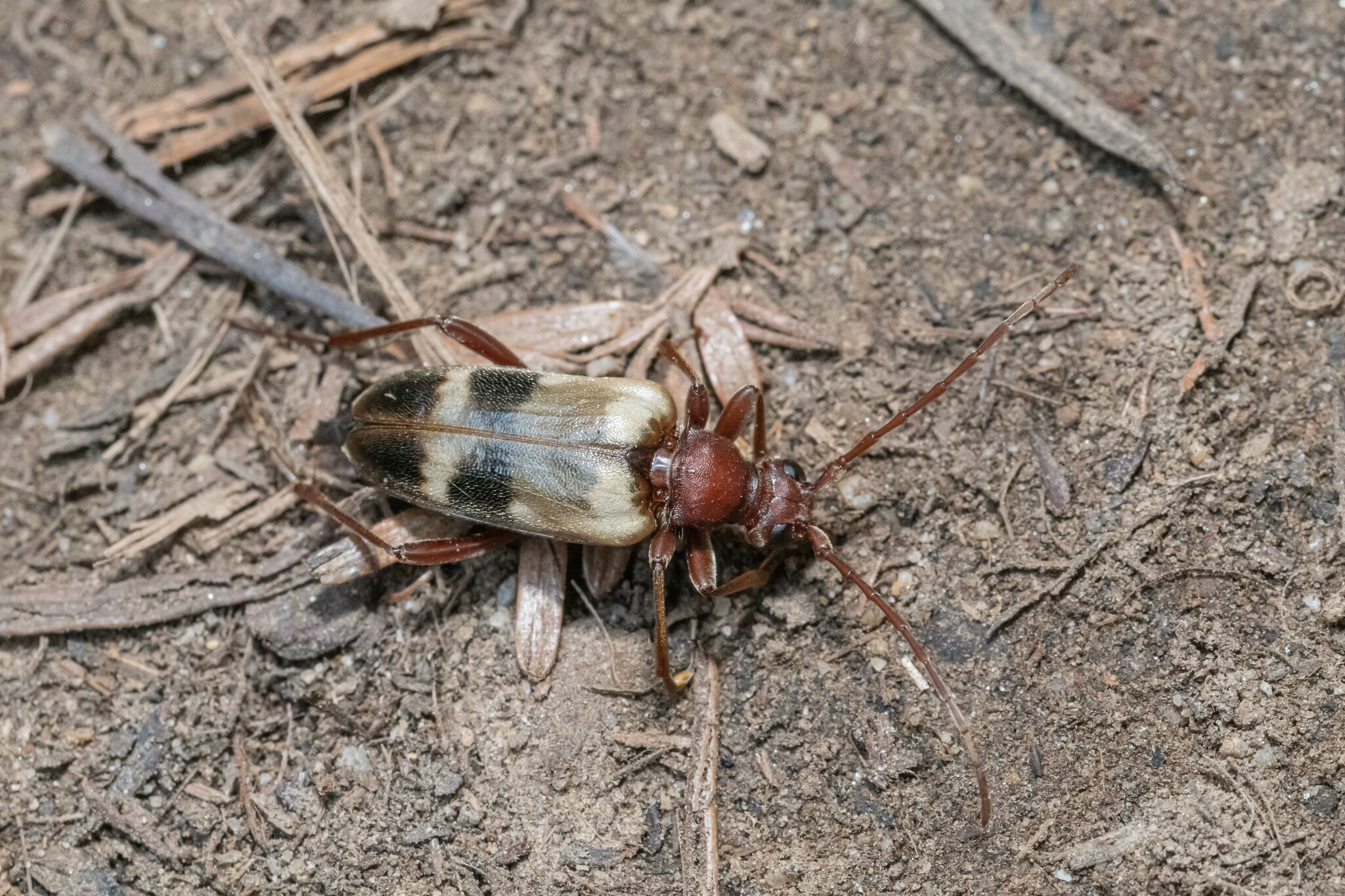

Scientific classification
- Kingdom: Animalia
- Phylum: Arthropoda
- Class: Insecta
- Order: Coleoptera
- Suborder: Polyphaga
- Infraorder: Cucujiformia
- Family: Cerambycidae
- Genus: Dorcasina
- Species: D. matthewsii

Binomial name
- Dorcasina matthewsii (LeConte, 1869)

Synonyms
- Dorcasina macrocera (Casey, 1913); Dorcasina matthewsi (LeConte, 1869)

= Dorcasina matthewsii =

Species of beetle

Dorcasina matthewsii is a species of flower longhorn in the beetle family Cerambycidae. It is found in North America and was described by John Lawrence LeConte in 1869.

Dorcasina matthewsii is sometimes spelled "Dorcasina matthewsi".
