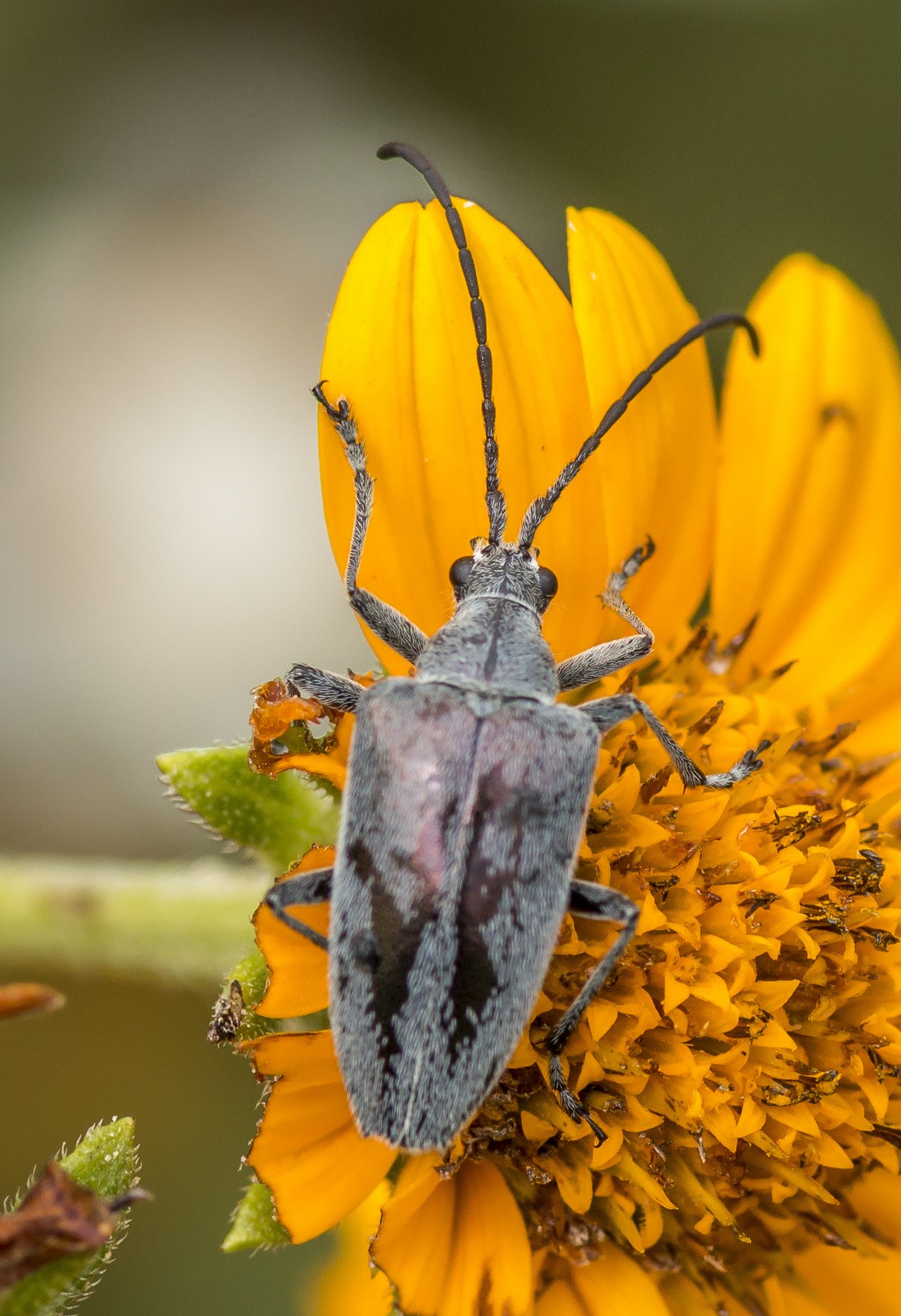

Scientific classification
- Kingdom: Animalia
- Phylum: Arthropoda
- Class: Insecta
- Order: Coleoptera
- Suborder: Polyphaga
- Infraorder: Cucujiformia
- Family: Cerambycidae
- Genus: Tomentgaurotes
- Species: T. batesi

Binomial name
- Tomentgaurotes batesi (Aurivillius, 1912)

= Tomentgaurotes batesi =

Species of beetle

Tomentgaurotes batesi is a species of beetle in the family Cerambycidae. It was first described by Per Olof Christopher Aurivillius in 1912.
