= Apiocephalus =

Scientific classification
- Kingdom: Animalia
- Phylum: Arthropoda
- Class: Insecta
- Order: Coleoptera
- Suborder: Polyphaga
- Infraorder: Cucujiformia
- Family: Cerambycidae
- Subfamily: Lepturinae
- Tribe: Rhagiini
- Genus: Apiocephalus; Gahan, 1898

Genus of beetles

Apiocephalus is a genus of beetles in the family Cerambycidae, containing the following species:

- Apiocephalus licheneus Gahan, 1906
- Apiocephalus punctipennis Gahan, 1898
