= Choriolaus howdeni =

Scientific classification
- Domain: Eukaryota
- Kingdom: Animalia
- Phylum: Arthropoda
- Class: Insecta
- Order: Coleoptera
- Suborder: Polyphaga
- Infraorder: Cucujiformia
- Family: Cerambycidae
- Genus: Choriolaus
- Species: C. howdeni

Binomial name
- Choriolaus howdeni Giesbert & Wappes, 1999

Species of beetle

Choriolaus howdeni is a species of beetle in the family Cerambycidae. It was described by Giesbert and Wappes in 1999.
