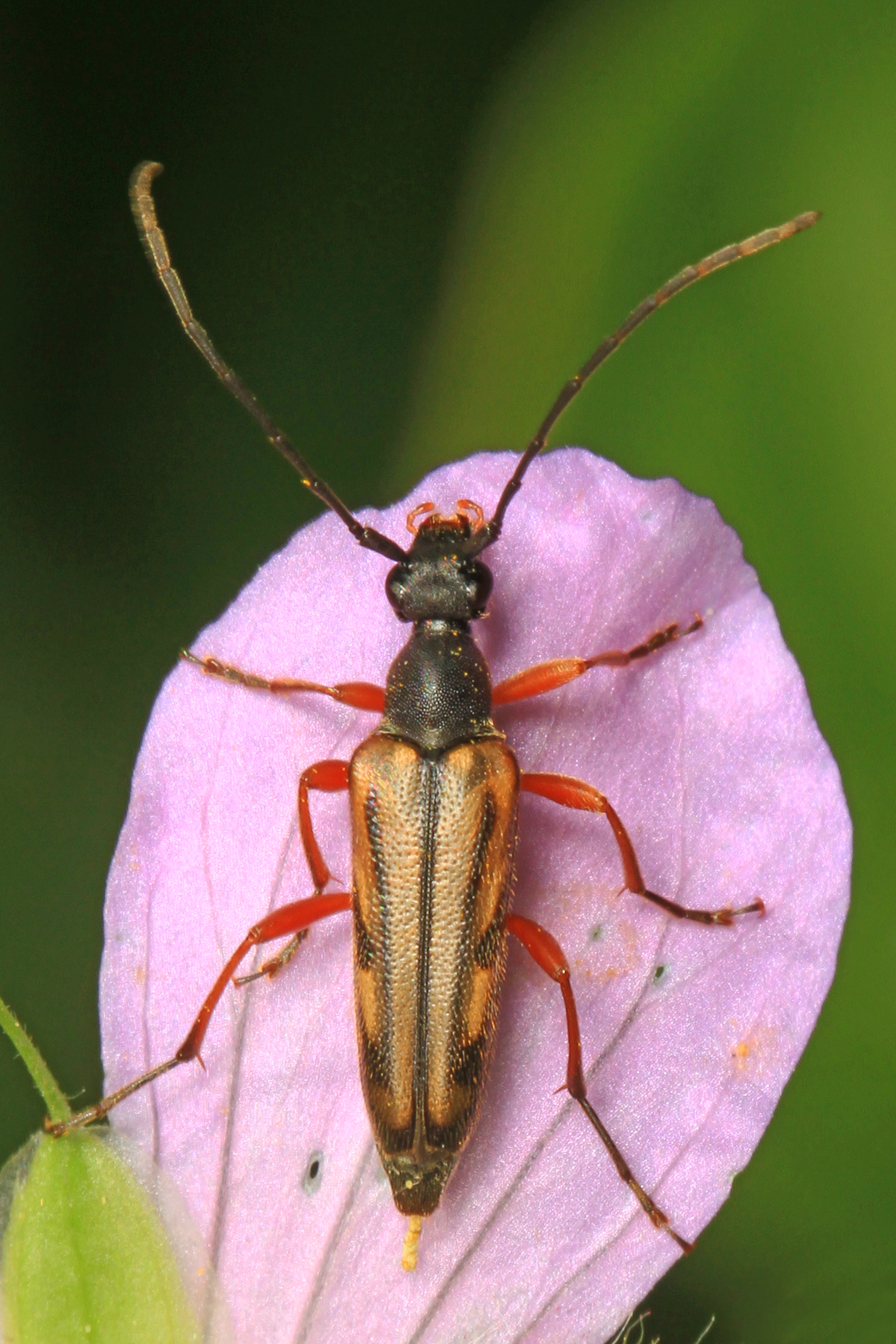

Scientific classification
- Kingdom: Animalia
- Phylum: Arthropoda
- Clade: Pancrustacea
- Class: Insecta
- Order: Coleoptera
- Suborder: Polyphaga
- Infraorder: Cucujiformia
- Family: Cerambycidae
- Genus: Analeptura
- Species: A. lineola

Binomial name
- Analeptura lineola (Say, 1824)

= Analeptura lineola =

Species of beetle

Analeptura lineola, the lined longhorn, is a species of beetle in the family Cerambycidae that is found throughout the eastern United States and Canada. It is an anthophilous species, feeding on flower nectar as an adult. In the larval stage, this species bores into the bases of decaying woody plants, including red maple, chestnut, hazelnut, cherry, basswood, viburnum, and laurel.
