= Pseudoxylosteus =

Scientific classification
- Kingdom: Animalia
- Phylum: Arthropoda
- Class: Insecta
- Order: Coleoptera
- Suborder: Polyphaga
- Infraorder: Cucujiformia
- Family: Cerambycidae
- Subfamily: Lepturinae
- Tribe: Xylosteini
- Genus: Pseudoxylosteus; Sama, 1993

Species
- Pseudoxylosteus ornatus (LeConte, 1873)

Genus of beetles

Pseudoxylosteus is a genus of flower longhorn beetles in the family Cerambycidae. There is a single species in Pseudoxylosteus, P. ornatus, found in the western United States. It is about 10 mm in length.

== Description ==
Adults measure approximately 10–13 mm in length. The body is dark brown to black with lighter markings on the elytra. The antennae are slightly shorter than the body length. Like other members of the subfamily Lepturinae, the species is associated with flowers and is believed to feed on nectar and pollen.

== Distribution ==
Pseudoxylosteus ornatus is native to the western United States, with most records from California. Additional observations have been reported from southern Oregon, particularly in the Siskiyou Mountains.

== Taxonomy ==
The species was originally described by John Lawrence LeConte in 1873 and was later transferred to the monotypic genus Pseudoxylosteus by Sama in 1993.
