= Choriolaus filicornis =

Scientific classification
- Domain: Eukaryota
- Kingdom: Animalia
- Phylum: Arthropoda
- Class: Insecta
- Order: Coleoptera
- Suborder: Polyphaga
- Infraorder: Cucujiformia
- Family: Cerambycidae
- Genus: Choriolaus
- Species: C. filicornis

Binomial name
- Choriolaus filicornis (Linsley & Chemsak, 1971)

Species of beetle

Choriolaus filicornis is a species of beetle in the family Cerambycidae. It was described by Linsley and Chemsak in 1971.
