= Megachoriolaus texanus =

Scientific classification
- Domain: Eukaryota
- Kingdom: Animalia
- Phylum: Arthropoda
- Class: Insecta
- Order: Coleoptera
- Suborder: Polyphaga
- Infraorder: Cucujiformia
- Family: Cerambycidae
- Genus: Megachoriolaus
- Species: M. texanus

Binomial name
- Megachoriolaus texanus (Knull, 1941)

Species of beetle

Megachoriolaus texanus is a species of flower longhorn in the beetle family Cerambycidae. It is found in North America.
