= Choriolaus derhami =

Scientific classification
- Domain: Eukaryota
- Kingdom: Animalia
- Phylum: Arthropoda
- Class: Insecta
- Order: Coleoptera
- Suborder: Polyphaga
- Infraorder: Cucujiformia
- Family: Cerambycidae
- Genus: Choriolaus
- Species: C. derhami

Binomial name
- Choriolaus derhami Chemsak & Linsley, 1976

Species of beetle

Choriolaus derhami is a species of beetle in the family Cerambycidae. It was described by Chemsak and Linsley in 1976.
