= Choriolaus sabinoensis =

Scientific classification
- Domain: Eukaryota
- Kingdom: Animalia
- Phylum: Arthropoda
- Class: Insecta
- Order: Coleoptera
- Suborder: Polyphaga
- Infraorder: Cucujiformia
- Family: Cerambycidae
- Genus: Choriolaus
- Species: C. sabinoensis

Binomial name
- Choriolaus sabinoensis (Knull, 1954)

Species of beetle

Choriolaus sabinoensis is a species of beetle in the family Cerambycidae. It was described by Knull in 1954.
