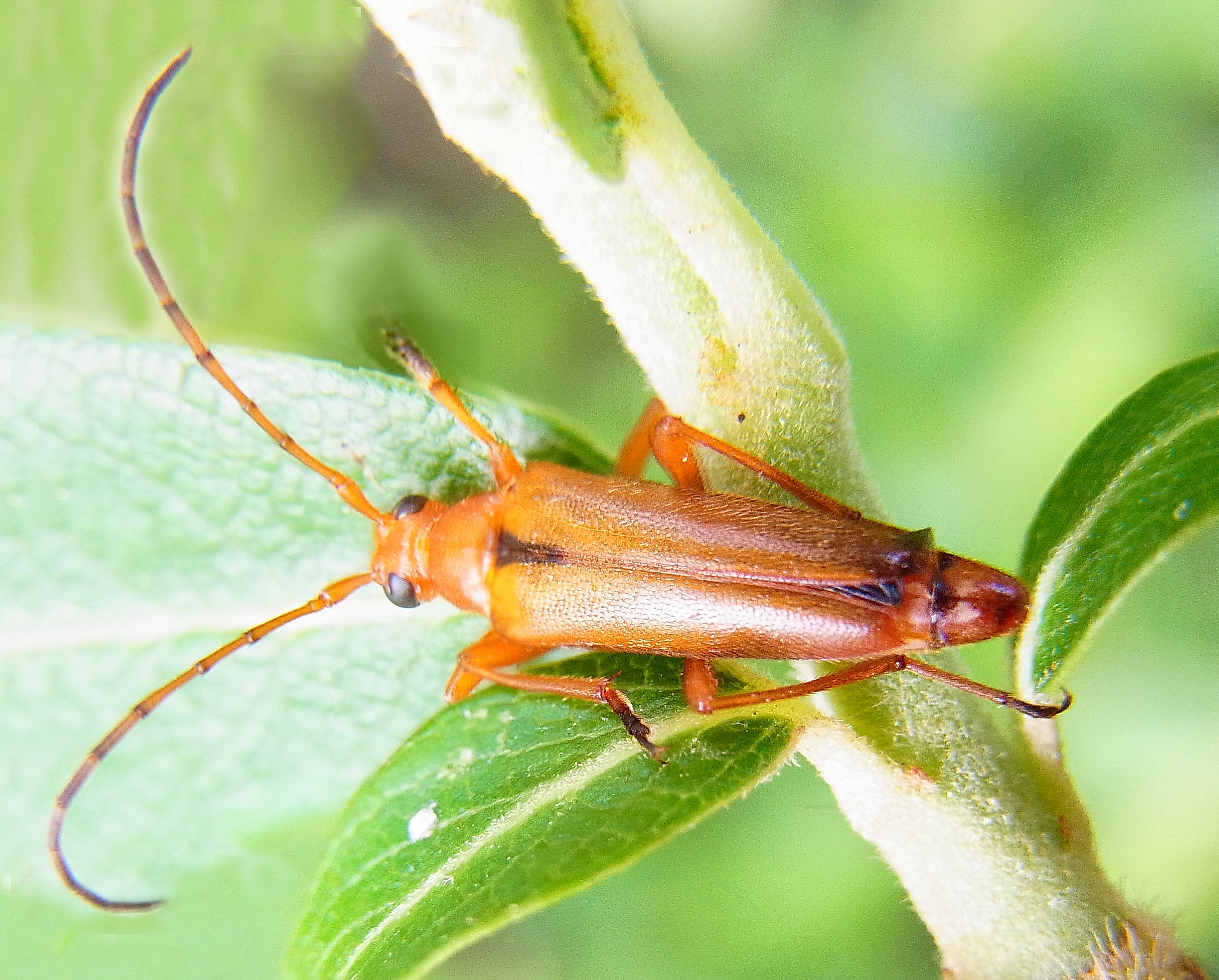
- Pedostrangalia revestita

Scientific classification
- Domain: Eukaryota
- Kingdom: Animalia
- Phylum: Arthropoda
- Class: Insecta
- Order: Coleoptera
- Suborder: Polyphaga
- Infraorder: Cucujiformia
- Family: Cerambycidae
- Subfamily: Lepturinae
- Genus: Pedostrangalia; Sokolov, 1896

= Pedostrangalia =

Genus of beetles

Pedostrangalia is a genus of beetles which belong to the subfamily Lepturinae in the family of longhorn beetles.

== Appearance ==
Medium-sized, slim, brown-red to black longhorn beetles. In all cases, some individuals have red wing-coverings, and some have black. The antennae are thin, and about the same length as the body. The pronotum is bell-shaped, with wings tapering backwards. The legs are medium-sized, and thin.

== Life ==
The larvae develop in rotten, often dead, wood which is contact with living wood, often of different type of trees. Development usually takes two to three years. Adult beetles are most active in mid-summer, and visit a variety of flowers, particularly Apiaceae and other plants with white, open flowers. This is not true of all species. Lepturinae are lively insects compared to other longhorn beetles which are quite slow.

== Habitat ==
The insects are found across most of Europe and Asia.

== Species ==
Subgenus Neosphenalia Löbl, 2010

- Pedostrangalia adaliae (Reitter, 1885)
- Pedostrangalia ariadne Daniel K., 1904
- Pedostrangalia emmipoda (Mulsant, 1863)
- Pedostrangalia femoralis (Motschulsky, 1860)
- Pedostrangalia kurda Sama, 1996
- Pedostrangalia raggii Sama, 1992
- Pedostrangalia riccardoi Holzschuh, 1984
- Pedostrangalia verticalis (Germar 1822)
- Pedostrangalia verticenigra (Pic, 1892)

Subgenus Pedostrangalia (sensu stricto)

- Pedostrangalia afghanistana Satô & Ohbayashi, 1976
- Pedostrangalia imberbis (Ménétriés, 1832)
- Pedostrangalia muneaka (Mitono & Tamanuki, 1939)
- Pedostrangalia nobilis Holzschuh, 2008
- Pedostrangalia quadrimaculata Chen & Chiang, 1996
- Pedostrangalia revestita (Linnaeus, 1767)
- Pedostrangalia rubricosa Holzschuh, 2008
- Pedostrangalia signifera Holzschuh, 1999
- Pedostrangalia tokatensis Sama, 1996
- Pedostrangalia tricolorata Holzschuh, 1991
- Pedostrangalia ulmi Holzschuh, 1982
