= Choriolaus gracilis =

Scientific classification
- Domain: Eukaryota
- Kingdom: Animalia
- Phylum: Arthropoda
- Class: Insecta
- Order: Coleoptera
- Suborder: Polyphaga
- Infraorder: Cucujiformia
- Family: Cerambycidae
- Genus: Choriolaus
- Species: C. gracilis

Binomial name
- Choriolaus gracilis (Chemsak & Linsley, 1974)

Species of beetle

Choriolaus gracilis is a species of beetle in the family Cerambycidae. It was described by Chemsak and Linsley in 1974.
