= Orthochoriolaus =

Orthochoriolaus chihuahuae

Scientific classification
- Kingdom: Animalia
- Phylum: Arthropoda
- Class: Insecta
- Order: Coleoptera
- Suborder: Polyphaga
- Infraorder: Cucujiformia
- Family: Cerambycidae
- Subfamily: Lepturinae
- Tribe: Lepturini
- Genus: Orthochoriolaus; Linsley & Chemsak, 1976
- Species: O. chihuahuae

Binomial name
- Orthochoriolaus chihuahuae (Bates, 1885)

Genus of beetles

Orthochoriolaus is a genus of flower longhorns in the beetle family Cerambycidae. This genus has a single species, Orthochoriolaus chihuahuae, found in Arizona and western Mexico.
