= Pseudotypocerus =

Scientific classification
- Kingdom: Animalia
- Phylum: Arthropoda
- Class: Insecta
- Order: Coleoptera
- Suborder: Polyphaga
- Infraorder: Cucujiformia
- Family: Cerambycidae
- Subfamily: Lepturinae
- Genus: Pseudotypocerus

Genus of beetles

Pseudotypocerus is a genus of beetles in the family Cerambycidae, containing the following species:

- Pseudotypocerus ater Chemsak & Linsley, 1981
- Pseudotypocerus inflaticollis Chemsak & Linsley, 1976
- Pseudotypocerus nitidicollis Chemsak & Linsley, 1976
- Pseudotypocerus proxater Giesbert, 1997
- Pseudotypocerus pubipennis Bates, 1885
- Pseudotypocerus rufiventris (Bates, 1872)
- Pseudotypocerus virescens Chemsak & Linsley, 1976
