= Alosternida =

Alosternida chalybaea

Scientific classification
- Kingdom: Animalia
- Phylum: Arthropoda
- Class: Insecta
- Order: Coleoptera
- Suborder: Polyphaga
- Infraorder: Cucujiformia
- Family: Cerambycidae
- Genus: Alosternida
- Species: A. chalybaea

Binomial name
- Alosternida chalybaea (Haldeman, 1847)

Synonyms
- Alosternida chalybea

Genus of beetles

Alosternida chalybaea is a species of beetle in the family Cerambycidae, the only species in the genus Alosternida.
