= Charisalia =

Scientific classification
- Kingdom: Animalia
- Phylum: Arthropoda
- Class: Insecta
- Order: Coleoptera
- Suborder: Polyphaga
- Infraorder: Cucujiformia
- Family: Cerambycidae
- Tribe: Lepturini
- Genus: Charisalia; Casey, 1913
- Species: C. americana

Binomial name
- Charisalia americana (Haldeman, 1847)

Genus of beetles

Charisalia is a genus of flower longhorns in the beetle family Cerambycidae. This genus has a single species, Charisalia americana, found in the eastern United States.
