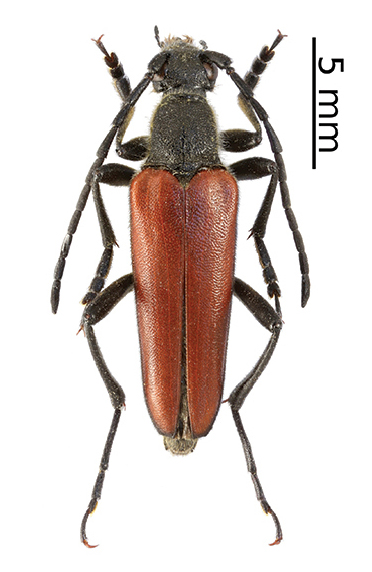
- Lepturalia nigripes rufipennis, male

Scientific classification
- Kingdom: Animalia
- Phylum: Arthropoda
- Class: Insecta
- Order: Coleoptera
- Suborder: Polyphaga
- Infraorder: Cucujiformia
- Family: Cerambycidae
- Genus: Lepturalia; Reitter, 1912
- Species: L. nigripes

Binomial name
- Lepturalia nigripes (Degeer, 1775)

= Lepturalia =

Monotypic genus of beetles

Lepturalia is a monotypic genus of beetles belonging to the family Cerambycidae. Its sole accepted species is Lepturalia nigripes, first described by Degeer in 1775.
