= Neoleptura =

Scientific classification
- Kingdom: Animalia
- Phylum: Arthropoda
- Class: Insecta
- Order: Coleoptera
- Suborder: Polyphaga
- Infraorder: Cucujiformia
- Family: Cerambycidae
- Subfamily: Lepturinae
- Genus: Neoleptura

Genus of beetles

Neoleptura is a genus of beetles in the family Cerambycidae, containing the following species:

- Neoleptura alpina Chemsak & Linsley, 1976
- Neoleptura auripennis Chemsak & Linsley, 1976
- Neoleptura lecontei Thomson, 1860
- Neoleptura minutipunctis Chemsak & Linsley, 1976
