= Acmaeopsoides =

Acmaeopsoides rufula

Scientific classification
- Domain: Eukaryota
- Kingdom: Animalia
- Phylum: Arthropoda
- Class: Insecta
- Order: Coleoptera
- Suborder: Polyphaga
- Infraorder: Cucujiformia
- Family: Cerambycidae
- Subfamily: Lepturinae
- Tribe: Rhagiini
- Genus: Acmaeopsoides; Linsley & Chemsak, 1976
- Species: A. rufula

Binomial name
- Acmaeopsoides rufula (Haldeman, 1847)

Synonyms
- Acmaeops rufula Swaine & Hopping, 1928; Leptura rufula LeConte, 1850; Pachyta rufula Haldeman, 1847; Xestoleptura rufula Leng, 1920

Species of beetle

Acmaeopsoides rufula is a species of beetle in the family Cerambycidae, and the only species in the genus Acmaeopsoides. This beetle is distributed in Canada, and United States.
