= Megachoriolaus =

Scientific classification
- Kingdom: Animalia
- Phylum: Arthropoda
- Class: Insecta
- Order: Coleoptera
- Suborder: Polyphaga
- Infraorder: Cucujiformia
- Family: Cerambycidae
- Tribe: Lepturini
- Genus: Megachoriolaus

Genus of beetles

Megachoriolaus is a genus of beetles in the family Cerambycidae, containing the following species:

- Megachoriolaus atripennis (Bates, 1870)
- Megachoriolaus bicolor (Gounelle, 1911)
- Megachoriolaus chemsaki Linsley, 1970
- Megachoriolaus clarkei Monne & Monne, 2008
- Megachoriolaus cruentus (Martin, 1930)
- Megachoriolaus flammatus (Linsley, 1961)
- Megachoriolaus ignitus (Schaeffer, 1908)
- Megachoriolaus imitatrix Linsley, 1970
- Megachoriolaus lineaticollis Chemsak & Linsley, 1974
- Megachoriolaus nigricollis Chemsak & Linsley, 1974
- Megachoriolaus patricia (Bates, 1885)
- Megachoriolaus spiniferus (Linsley, 1961)
- Megachoriolaus sylvainae Audureau, 2010
- Megachoriolaus texanus (Knull, 1941)
- Megachoriolaus unicolor (Bates, 1892)
- Megachoriolaus venustus (Breme, 1844)
- Megachoriolaus yucatanus Giesbert & Wappes, 1999
