= Platerosida =

Platerosida howdeni

Scientific classification
- Kingdom: Animalia
- Phylum: Arthropoda
- Class: Insecta
- Order: Coleoptera
- Suborder: Polyphaga
- Infraorder: Cucujiformia
- Family: Cerambycidae
- Genus: Platerosida
- Species: P. howdeni

Binomial name
- Platerosida howdeni Linsley, 1970

Species of beetle

Platerosida howdeni is a species of beetle in the family Cerambycidae, the only species in the genus Platerosida.
