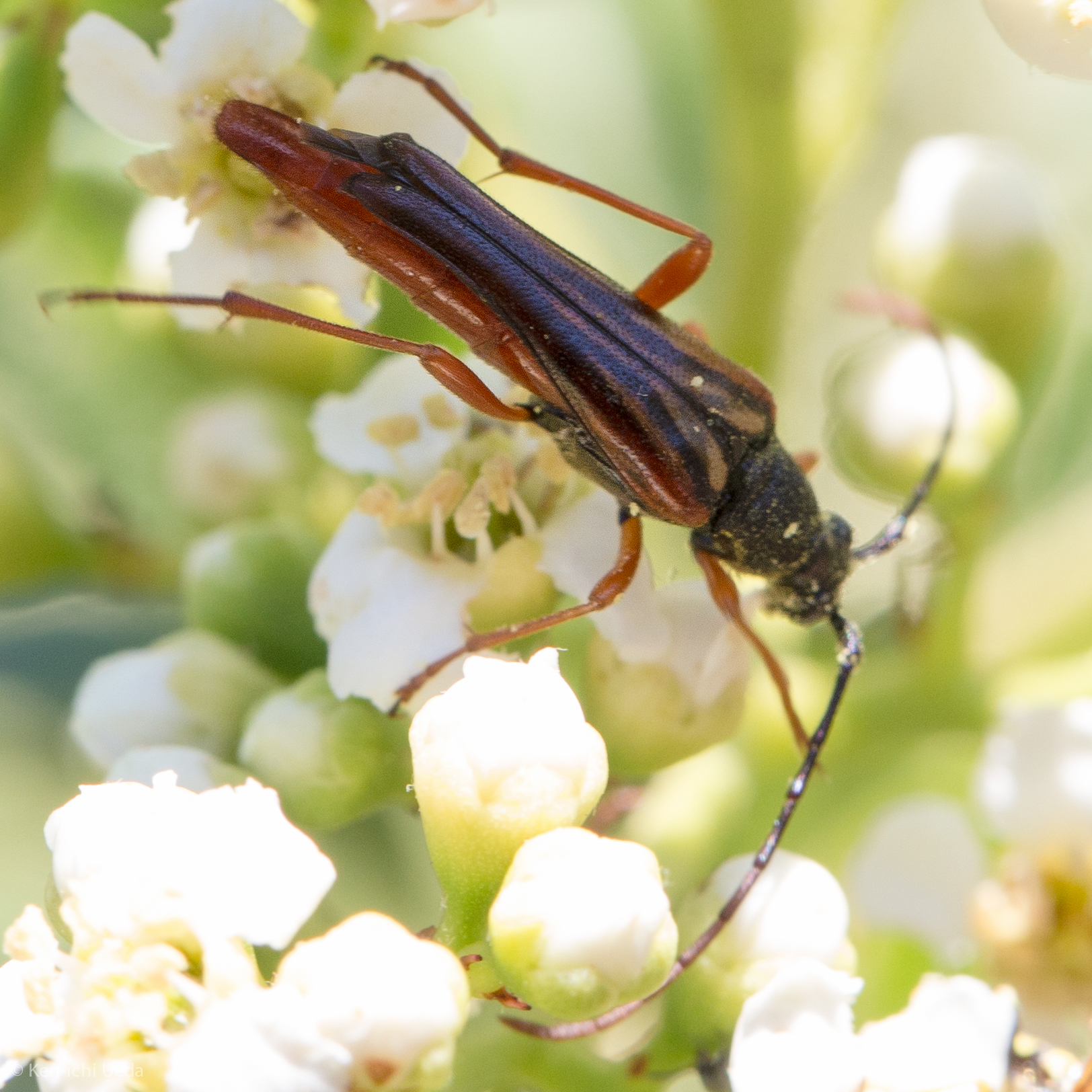
- Neobellamira delicata, California

Scientific classification
- Kingdom: Animalia
- Phylum: Arthropoda
- Class: Insecta
- Order: Coleoptera
- Suborder: Polyphaga
- Infraorder: Cucujiformia
- Family: Cerambycidae
- Tribe: Lepturini
- Genus: Neobellamira; Swaine & Hopping, 1928
- Species: N. delicata

Binomial name
- Neobellamira delicata (LeConte, 1874)

= Neobellamira =

Genus of beetles

Neobellamira is a genus of flower longhorns in the beetle family Cerambycidae. This genus has a single species, Neobellamira delicata, found in coastal states and provinces of North America.
