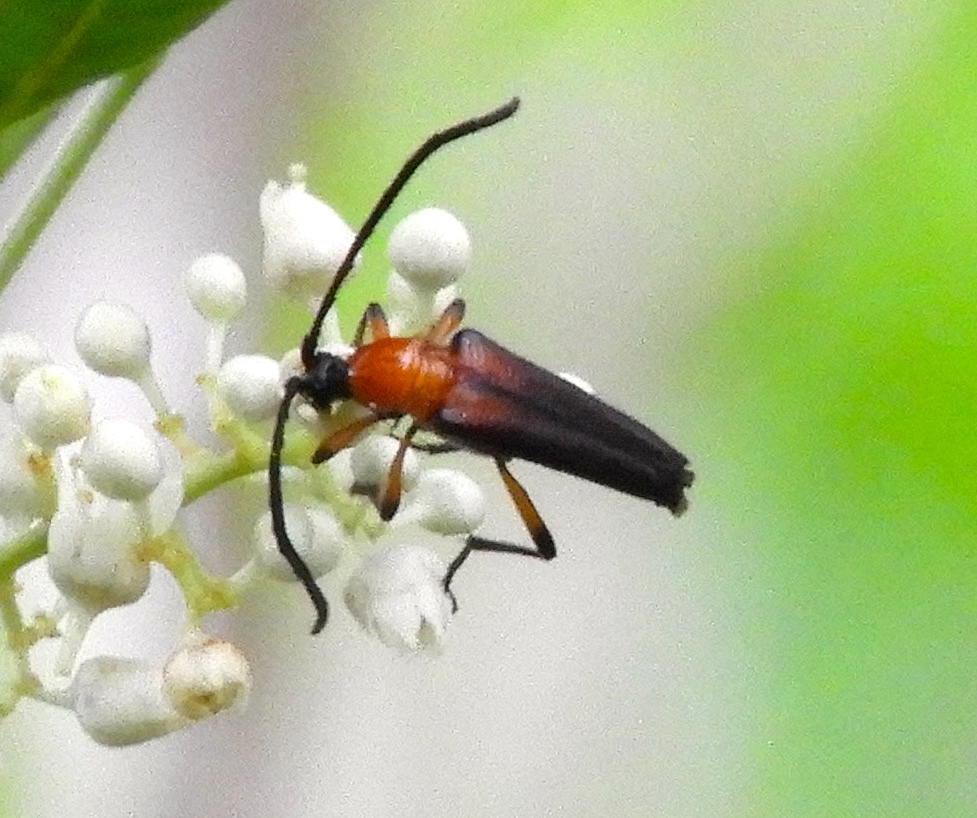
- Cyphonotida rostrata, México

Scientific classification
- Kingdom: Animalia
- Phylum: Arthropoda
- Class: Insecta
- Order: Coleoptera
- Suborder: Polyphaga
- Infraorder: Cucujiformia
- Family: Cerambycidae
- Tribe: Lepturini
- Genus: Cyphonotida; Casey, 1913
- Species: C. rostrata

Binomial name
- Cyphonotida rostrata (Bates, 1872)

= Cyphonotida =

Genus of beetles

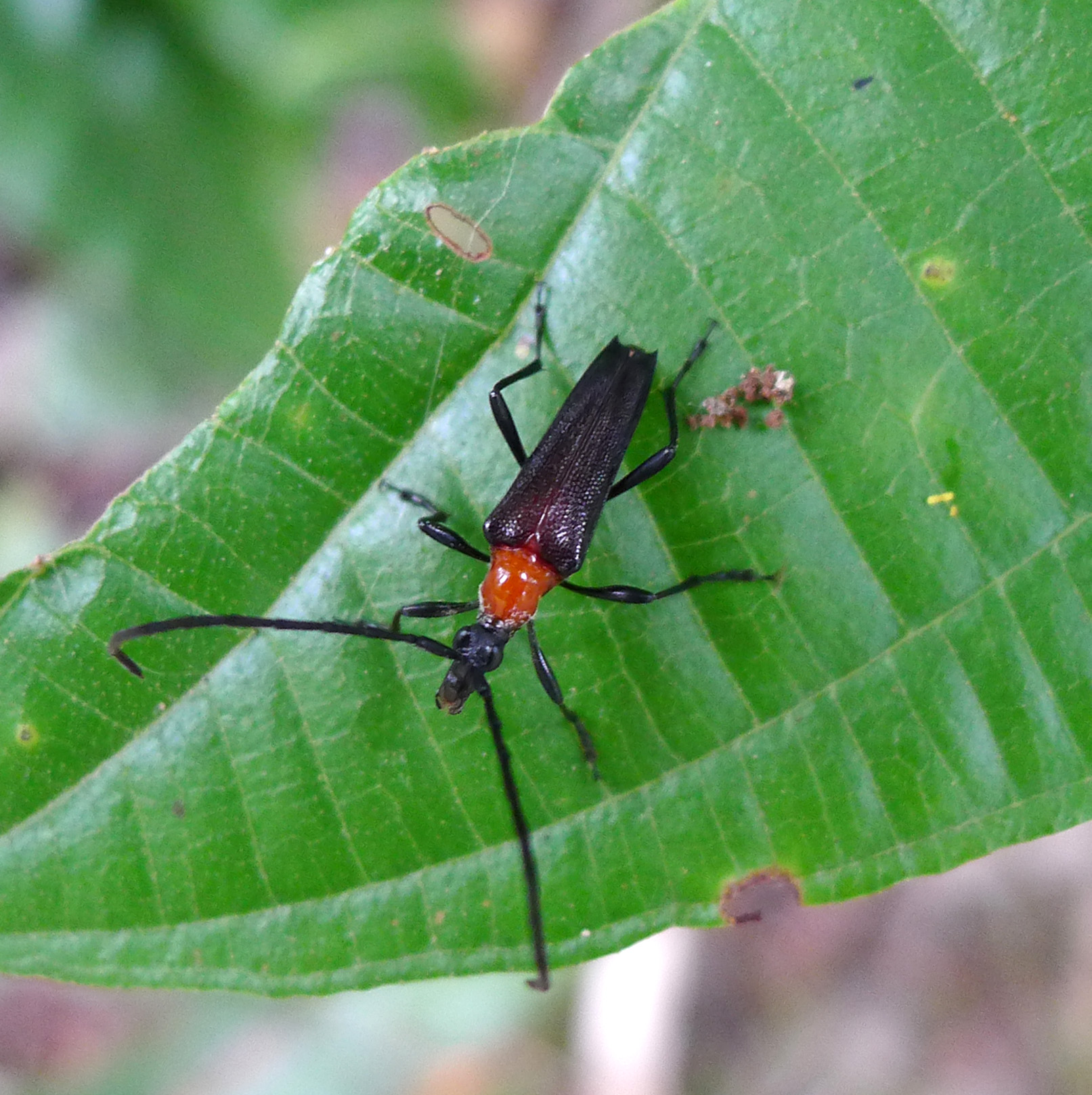
Cyphonotida rostrata, Costa Rica

Cyphonotida is a genus of flower longhorns in the beetle family Cerambycidae. This genus has a single species, Cyphonotida rostrata, found in North, Central, and South America.
