= Choriolaus =

Scientific classification
- Domain: Eukaryota
- Kingdom: Animalia
- Phylum: Arthropoda
- Class: Insecta
- Order: Coleoptera
- Suborder: Polyphaga
- Infraorder: Cucujiformia
- Family: Cerambycidae
- Subfamily: Lepturinae
- Genus: Choriolaus

Genus of beetles

Choriolaus is a genus of beetles in the family Cerambycidae, containing the following species:

- Choriolaus aegrotus Bates, 1885
- Choriolaus auratus Giesbert & Wappes, 1999
- Choriolaus celestae (Chemsak & Linsley, 1974)
- Choriolaus derhami Chemsak & Linsley, 1976
- Choriolaus filicornis (Linsley & Chemsak, 1971)
- Choriolaus flavirostris (Bates, 1880)
- Choriolaus fulveolus (Bates, 1885)
- Choriolaus gracilis (Chemsak & Linsley, 1974)
- Choriolaus hirsutus (Bates, 1885)
- Choriolaus howdeni Giesbert & Wappes, 1999
- Choriolaus latescens Bates, 1885
- Choriolaus nigripennis Giesbert & Wappes, 1999
- Choriolaus ruficollis (Pascoe, 1866)
- Choriolaus sabinoensis (Knull, 1954)
- Choriolaus sulcipennis Linsley, 1970
- Choriolaus suturalis Giesbert & Wappes, 1999
