= Meloemorpha =

Scientific classification
- Kingdom: Animalia
- Phylum: Arthropoda
- Class: Insecta
- Order: Coleoptera
- Suborder: Polyphaga
- Infraorder: Cucujiformia
- Family: Cerambycidae
- Subfamily: Lepturinae
- Genus: Meloemorpha

Genus of beetles

Meloemorpha is a genus of central American beetles in the family Cerambycidae, containing the following species:

- Meloemorpha aliena (Bates, 1880)
- Meloemorpha anomala (Bates, 1885)
