= Nemognathomimus =

Scientific classification
- Kingdom: Animalia
- Phylum: Arthropoda
- Class: Insecta
- Order: Coleoptera
- Suborder: Polyphaga
- Infraorder: Cucujiformia
- Family: Cerambycidae
- Subfamily: Lepturinae
- Genus: Nemognathomimus

Genus of beetles

Nemognathomimus is a genus of beetles in the family Cerambycidae, containing the following species:

- Nemognathomimus breviceps Giesbert, 1997
- Nemognathomimus michelbacheri Chemsak & Giesbert, 1986
- Nemognathomimus opacipennis Chemsak & Noguera, 1993
- Nemognathomimus pallidulus (Linsley, 1935)
