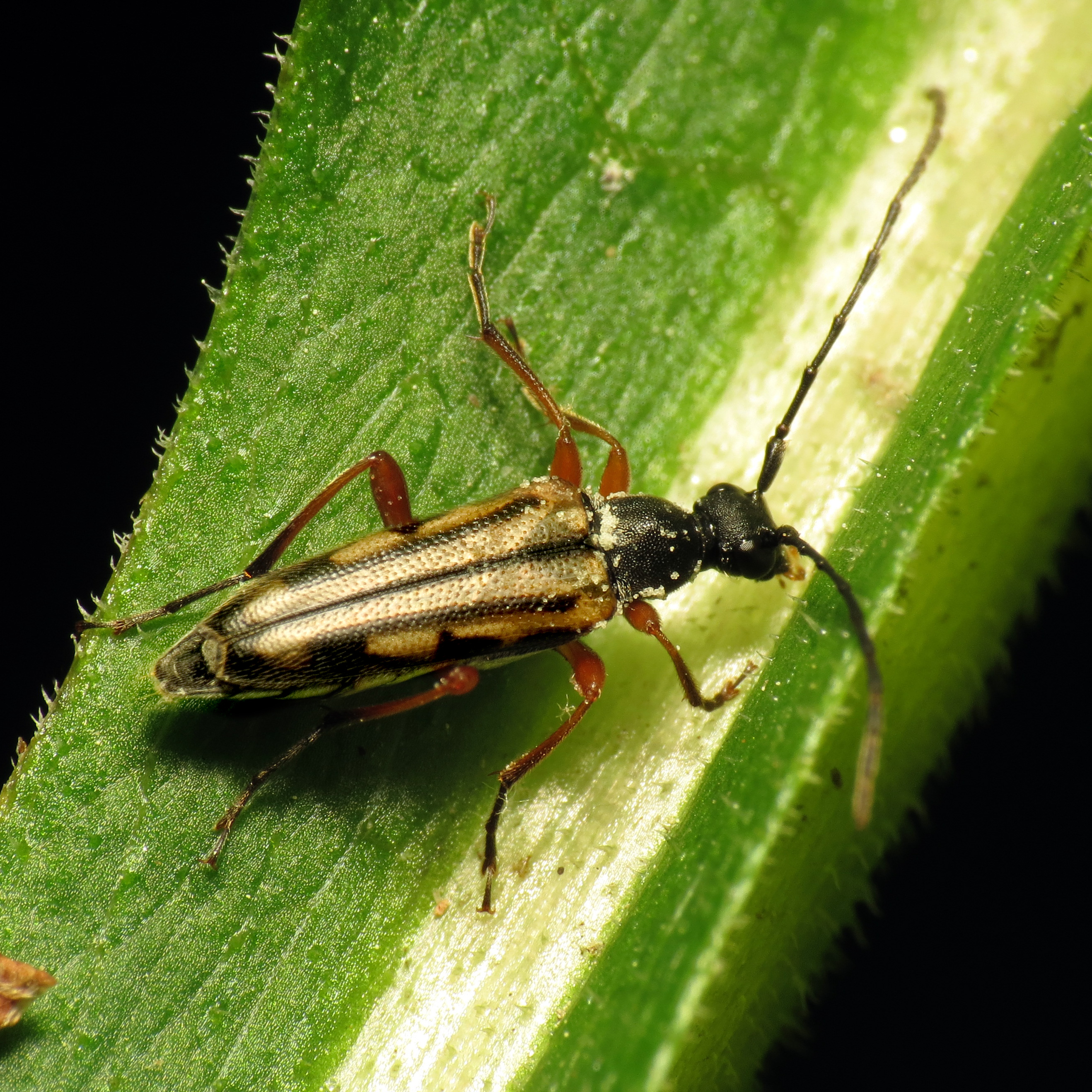

Scientific classification
- Domain: Eukaryota
- Kingdom: Animalia
- Phylum: Arthropoda
- Class: Insecta
- Order: Coleoptera
- Suborder: Polyphaga
- Infraorder: Cucujiformia
- Family: Cerambycidae
- Tribe: Lepturini
- Genus: Analeptura; Linsley & Chemsak, 1976

= Analeptura =

Genus of beetles

Analeptura is a genus of beetles in the family Cerambycidae, containing the following species:

- Analeptura fallax (Say, 1824)
- Analeptura lineola (Say, 1824)
