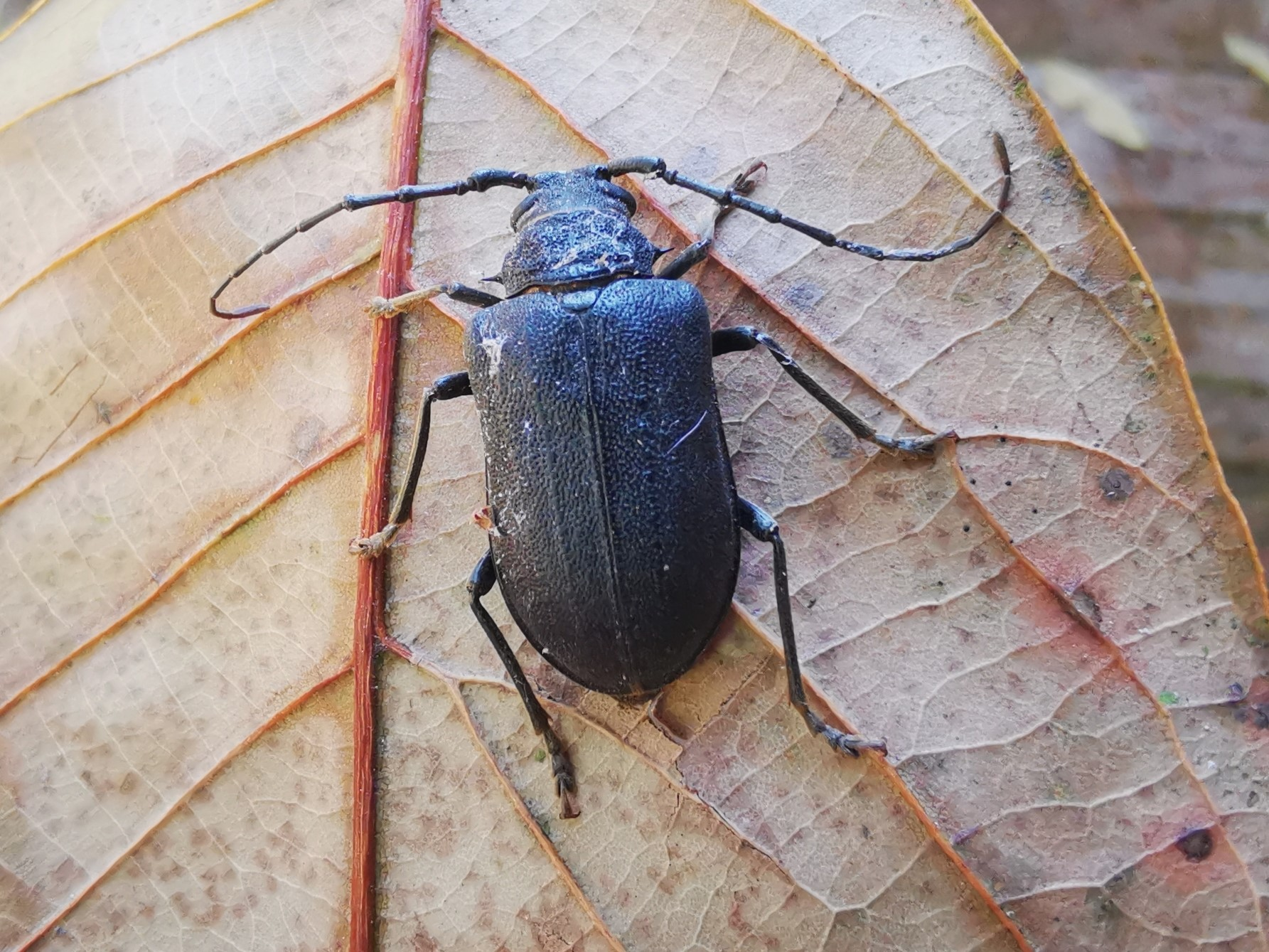

Scientific classification
- Kingdom: Animalia
- Phylum: Arthropoda
- Class: Insecta
- Order: Coleoptera
- Suborder: Polyphaga
- Infraorder: Cucujiformia
- Family: Cerambycidae
- Genus: Peithona
- Species: P. prionoides

Binomial name
- Peithona prionoides Gahan, 1906

= Peithona =

Genus of beetles

Peithona prionoides is a species of beetle in the family Cerambycidae, and the only species in the genus Peithona. It is found in India.
