= Mordellistenomimus =

Mordellistenomimus nanus

Scientific classification
- Kingdom: Animalia
- Phylum: Arthropoda
- Class: Insecta
- Order: Coleoptera
- Suborder: Polyphaga
- Infraorder: Cucujiformia
- Family: Cerambycidae
- Genus: Mordellistenomimus
- Species: M. nanus

Binomial name
- Mordellistenomimus nanus (Bates, 1885)

Genus of beetles

Mordellistenomimus nanus is a species of beetle in the family Cerambycidae, the only species in the genus Mordellistenomimus.
