= Macrochoriolaus =

Macrochoriolaus elegans

Scientific classification
- Kingdom: Animalia
- Phylum: Arthropoda
- Class: Insecta
- Order: Coleoptera
- Suborder: Polyphaga
- Infraorder: Cucujiformia
- Family: Cerambycidae
- Genus: Macrochoriolaus
- Species: M. elegans

Binomial name
- Macrochoriolaus elegans Linsley, 1970

Genus of beetles

Macrochoriolaus elegans is a species of beetle in the family Cerambycidae, the only species in the genus Macrochoriolaus.
