= Lycidocerus =

Lycidocerus sanguineus

Scientific classification
- Kingdom: Animalia
- Phylum: Arthropoda
- Class: Insecta
- Order: Coleoptera
- Suborder: Polyphaga
- Infraorder: Cucujiformia
- Family: Cerambycidae
- Genus: Lycidocerus
- Species: L. sanguineus

Binomial name
- Lycidocerus sanguineus Chemsak & Linsley, 1976

Genus of beetles

Lycidocerus fallax is a species of beetle in the family Cerambycidae, the only species in the genus Lycidocerus.
