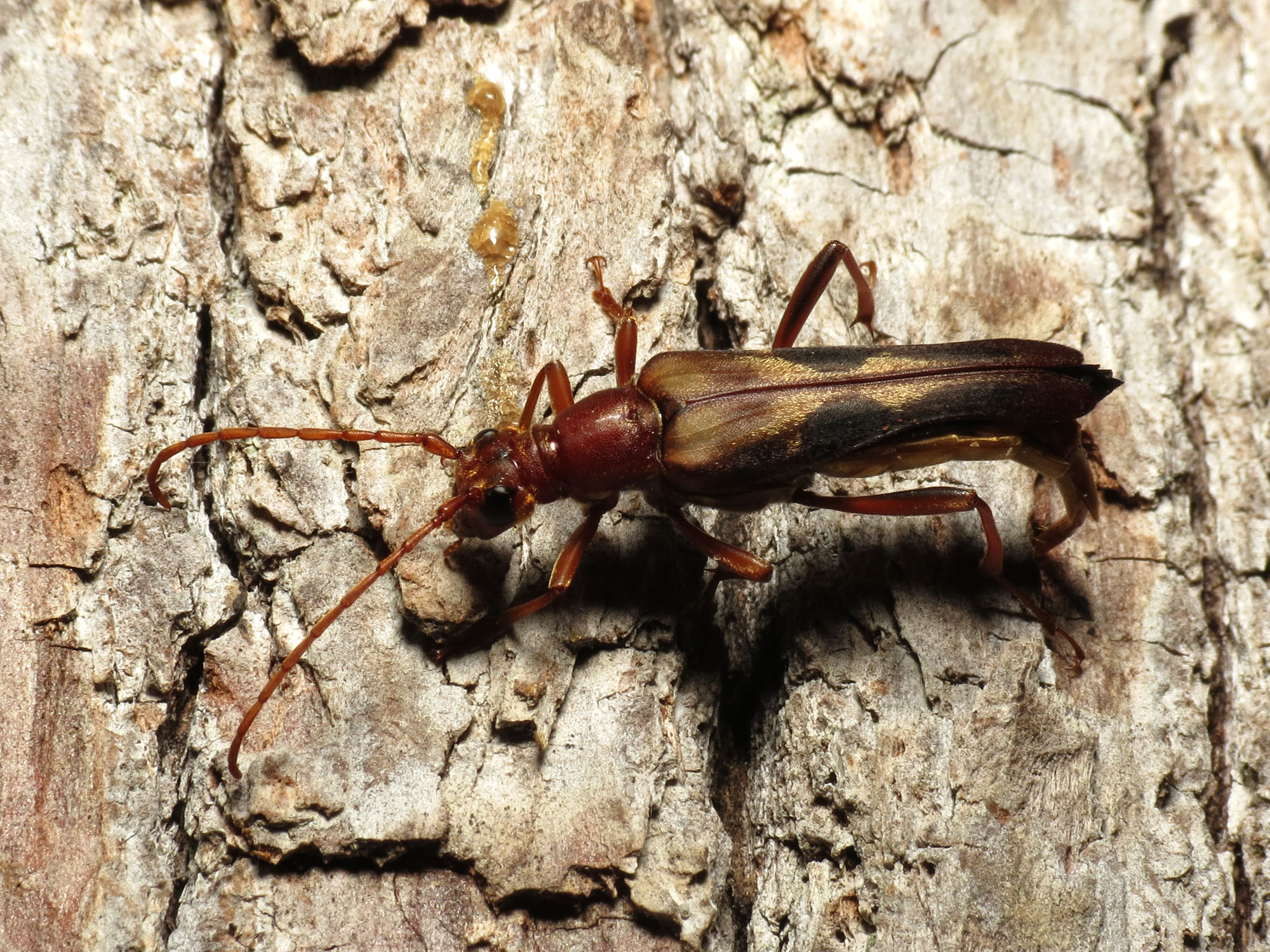
- Bellamira scalaris

Scientific classification
- Kingdom: Animalia
- Phylum: Arthropoda
- Clade: Pancrustacea
- Class: Insecta
- Order: Coleoptera
- Suborder: Polyphaga
- Infraorder: Cucujiformia
- Family: Cerambycidae
- Tribe: Lepturini
- Genus: Bellamira; LeConte, 1873
- Species: B. scalaris

Binomial name
- Bellamira scalaris (Say, 1827)

Synonyms
- Leptura scalaris Say, 1827; Toxotus coarctatus Haldeman, 1847

= Bellamira =

Genus of beetles

Bellamira is a genus of flower longhorns in the beetle family Cerambycidae. This genus has a single species, Bellamira scalaris, found in North America. It is primarily distributed in eastern North America but also recorded from Yucatan, Mexico.

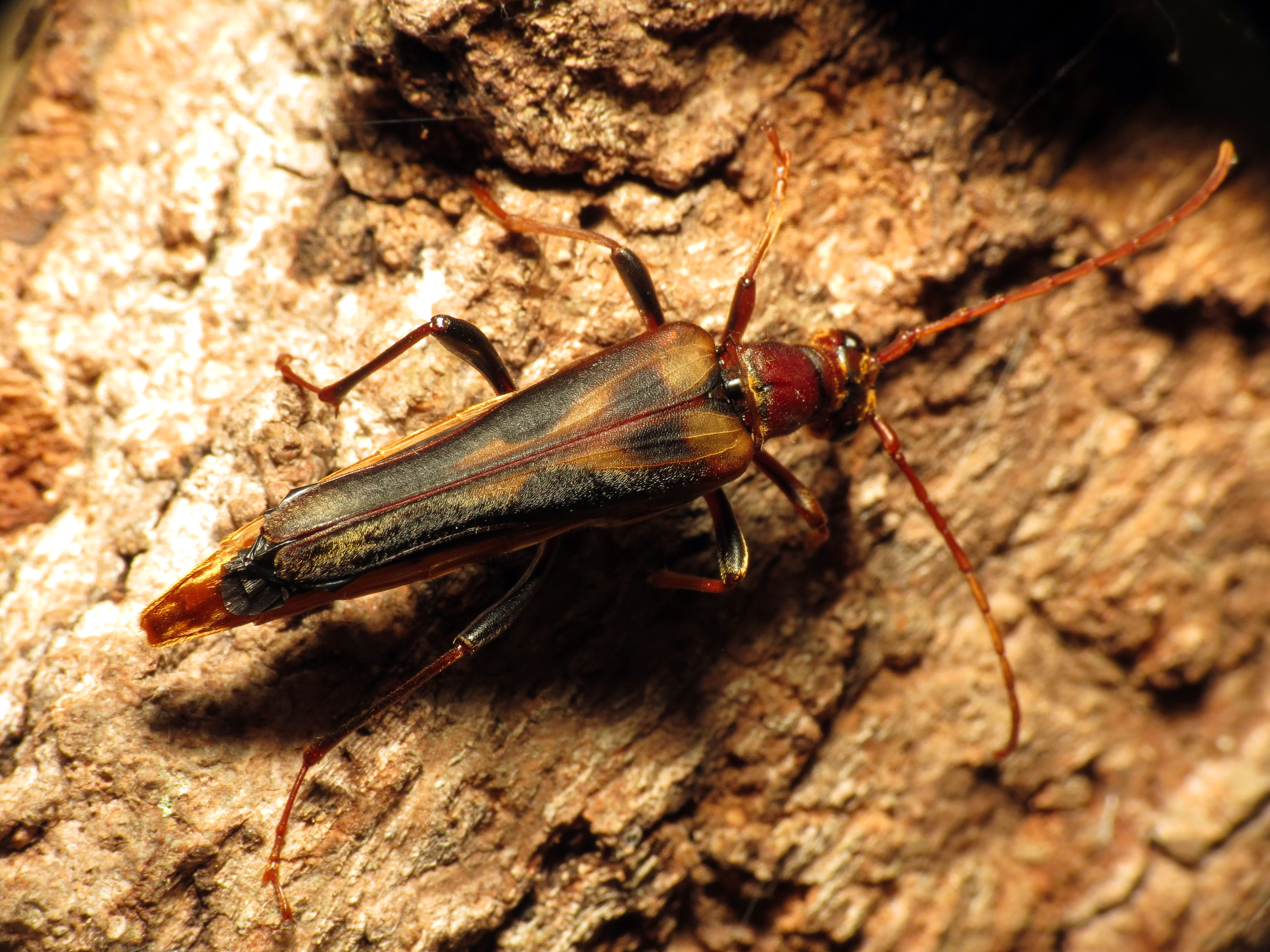
Bellamira scalaris

Bellamira scalaris measure 17–26 mm (0.67–1.02 in).
