= Eurylemma =

Eurylemma auricollis

Scientific classification
- Kingdom: Animalia
- Phylum: Arthropoda
- Class: Insecta
- Order: Coleoptera
- Suborder: Polyphaga
- Infraorder: Cucujiformia
- Family: Cerambycidae
- Genus: Eurylemma
- Species: E. auricollis

Binomial name
- Eurylemma auricollis Chemsak & Linsley, 1974

Genus of beetles

Eurylemma auricollis is a species of beetle in the family Cerambycidae, and it is the only species in the genus Eurylemma.
