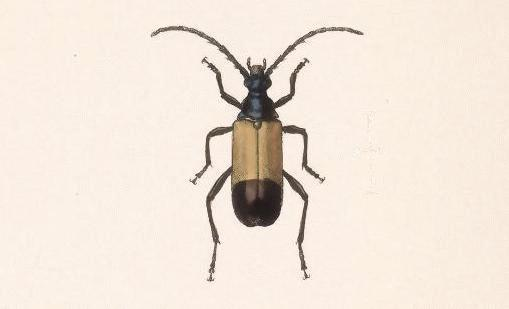
- Chontalia cyanicollis

Scientific classification
- Kingdom: Animalia
- Phylum: Arthropoda
- Class: Insecta
- Order: Coleoptera
- Suborder: Polyphaga
- Infraorder: Cucujiformia
- Family: Cerambycidae
- Genus: Chontalia
- Species: C. cyanicollis

Binomial name
- Chontalia cyanicollis Bates, 1872

= Chontalia =

Chontalia cyanicollis

Genus of beetles

Chontalia cyanicollis is a species of beetle in the family Cerambycidae, the only species in the genus Chontalia.
