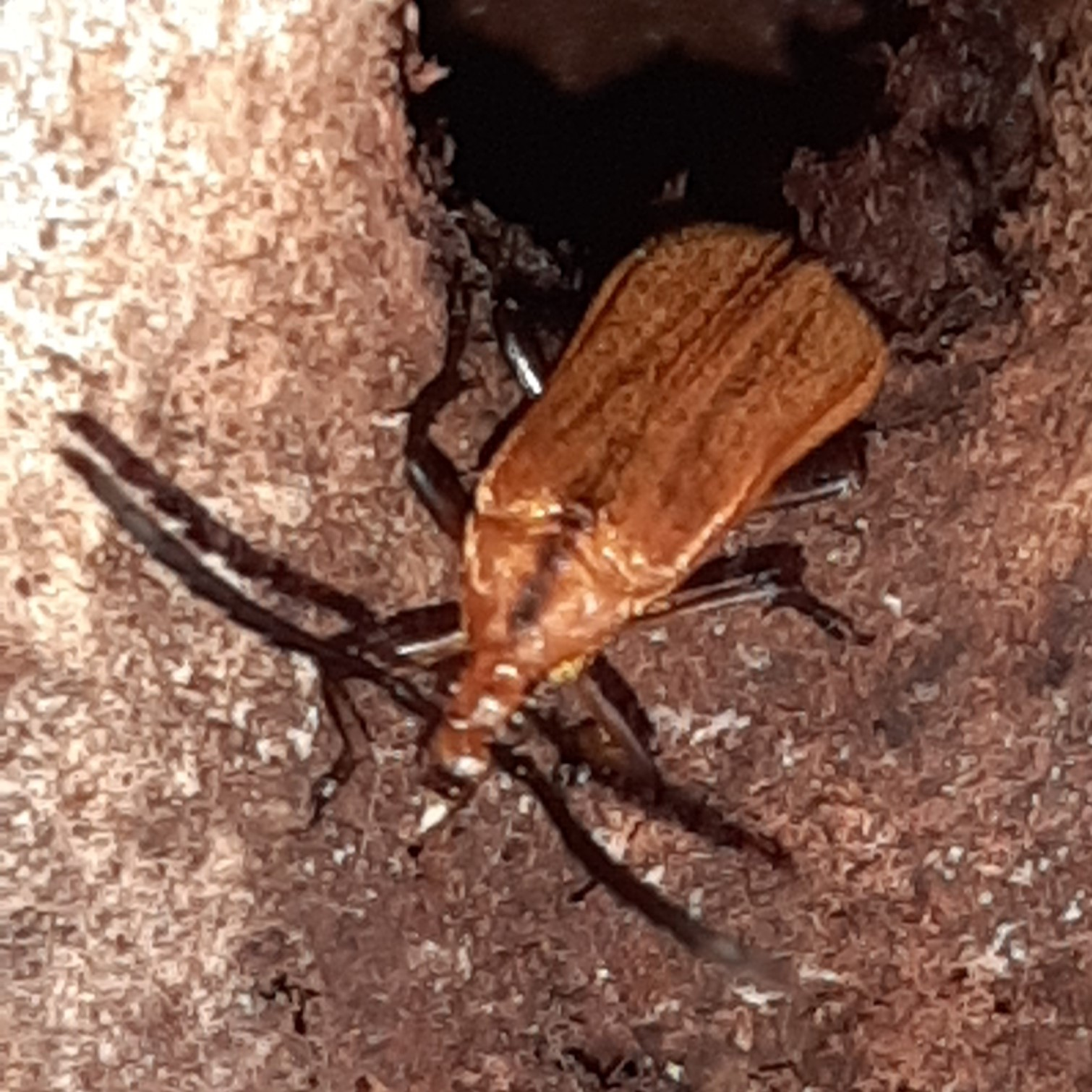

Scientific classification
- Kingdom: Animalia
- Phylum: Arthropoda
- Class: Insecta
- Order: Coleoptera
- Suborder: Polyphaga
- Infraorder: Cucujiformia
- Family: Cerambycidae
- Genus: Mimiptera; Linsley, 1961
- Species: M. fulvella

Binomial name
- Mimiptera fulvella (Bates, 1885)

= Mimiptera =

Mimiptera fulvella

Genus of beetles

Mimiptera fulvella is a species of beetle in the family Cerambycidae, the only species in the genus Mimiptera.
