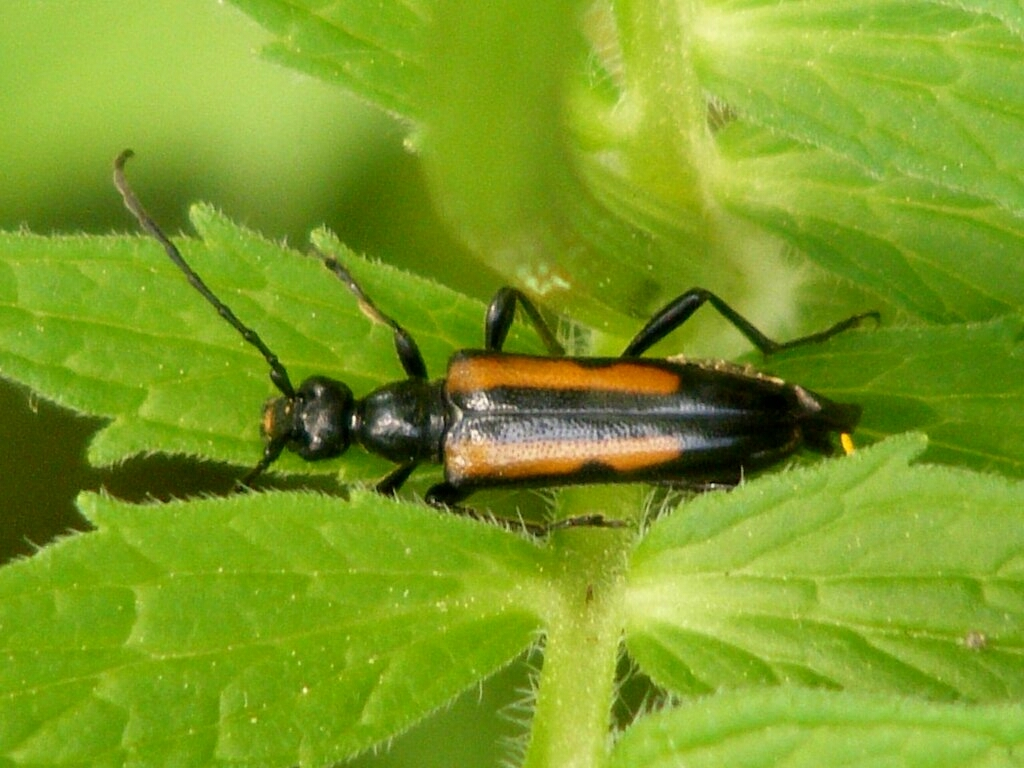

Scientific classification
- Domain: Eukaryota
- Kingdom: Animalia
- Phylum: Arthropoda
- Class: Insecta
- Order: Coleoptera
- Suborder: Polyphaga
- Infraorder: Cucujiformia
- Family: Cerambycidae
- Genus: Strangalepta
- Species: S. abbreviata

Binomial name
- Strangalepta abbreviata (Germar, 1824)

Synonyms
- Strangalepta gulosa (Kirby in Richardson, 1837); Strangalepta nitidipennis (Provancher, 1877); Strangalepta semivittata (Kirby in Richardson, 1837)

= Strangalepta =

Genus of beetles

Strangalepta is a genus containing only one species, Strangalepta abbreviata, a longhorned beetle in the family Cerambycidae.

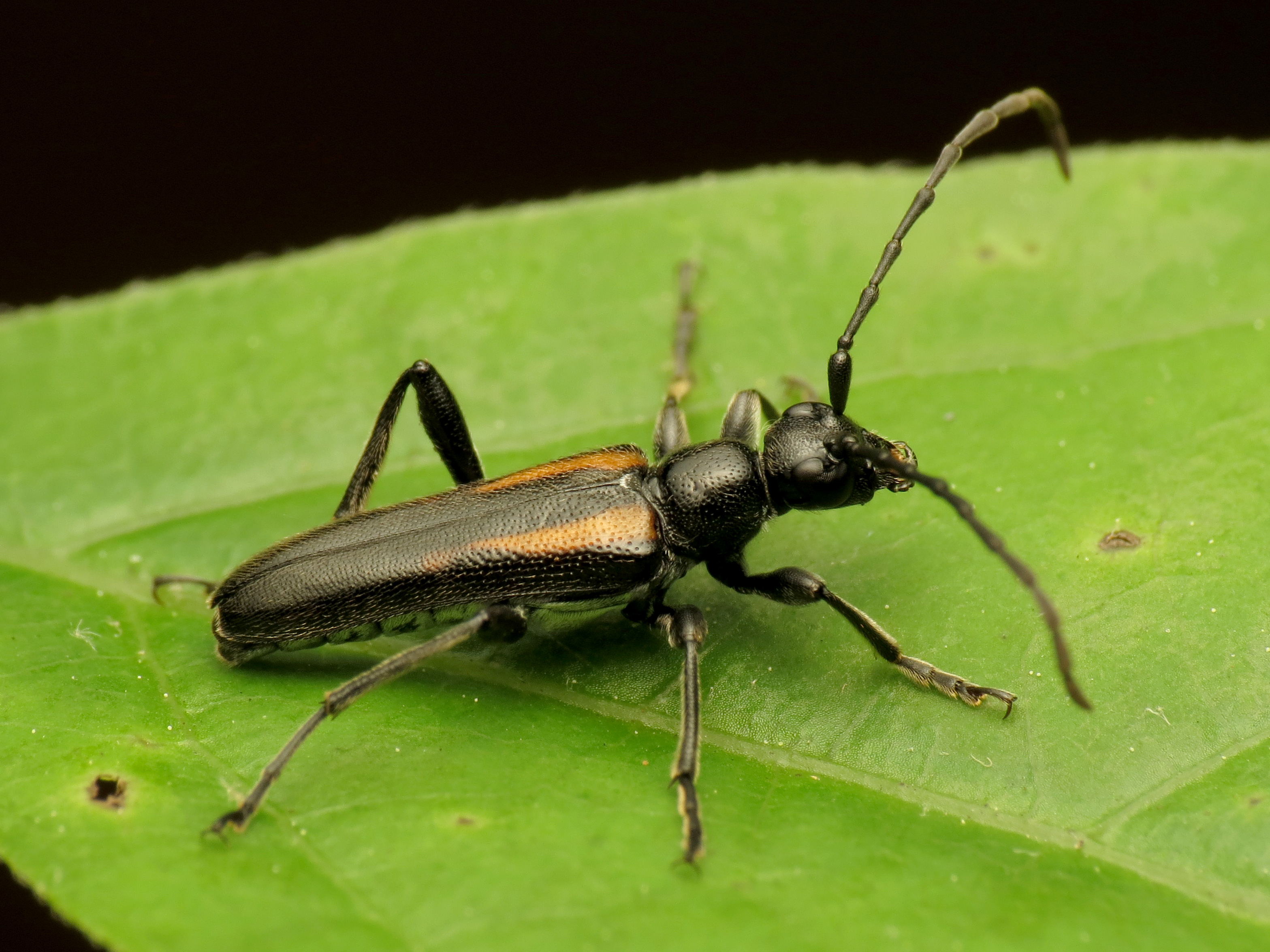

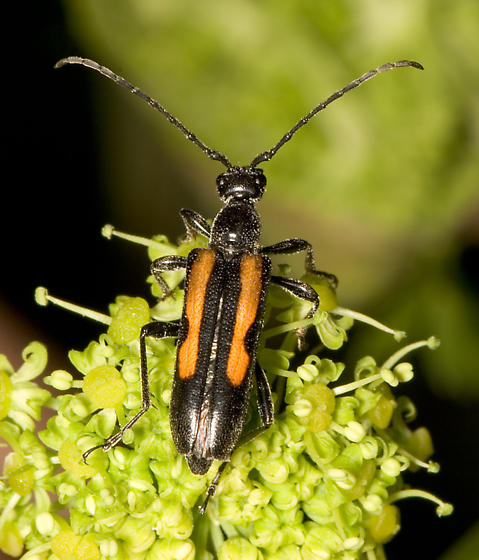
