= Idiopidonia =

Idiopidonia pedalis

Scientific classification
- Kingdom: Animalia
- Phylum: Arthropoda
- Class: Insecta
- Order: Coleoptera
- Suborder: Polyphaga
- Infraorder: Cucujiformia
- Family: Cerambycidae
- Genus: Idiopidonia
- Species: I. pedalis

Binomial name
- Idiopidonia pedalis (LeConte, 1861)

Genus of beetles

Idiopidonia pedalis is a species of beetle in the family Cerambycidae, the only species in the genus Idiopidonia.
