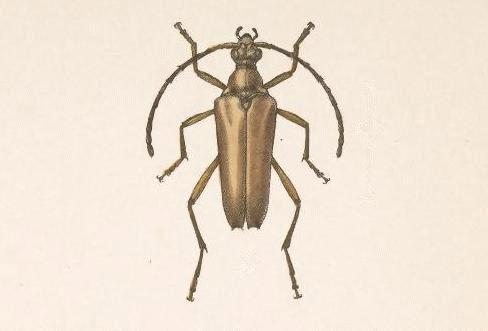

Scientific classification
- Kingdom: Animalia
- Phylum: Arthropoda
- Class: Insecta
- Order: Coleoptera
- Suborder: Polyphaga
- Infraorder: Cucujiformia
- Family: Cerambycidae
- Genus: Pseudophistomis
- Species: P. pallida

Binomial name
- Pseudophistomis pallida (Bates, 1872)

= Pseudophistomis =

Pseudophistomis pallida

Genus of beetles

Pseudophistomis pallida is a species of beetle in the family Cerambycidae, the only species in the genus Pseudophistomis.
