= Leptochoriolaus =

Leptochoriolaus opacus

Scientific classification
- Kingdom: Animalia
- Phylum: Arthropoda
- Class: Insecta
- Order: Coleoptera
- Suborder: Polyphaga
- Infraorder: Cucujiformia
- Family: Cerambycidae
- Genus: Leptochoriolaus
- Species: L. opacus

Binomial name
- Leptochoriolaus opacus Chemsak & Linsley, 1976

Genus of beetles

Leptochoriolaus opacus is a species of beetle in the family Cerambycidae, the only species in the genus Leptochoriolaus.
