= Lygistopteroides =

Lygistopteroides longipennis

Scientific classification
- Kingdom: Animalia
- Phylum: Arthropoda
- Class: Insecta
- Order: Coleoptera
- Suborder: Polyphaga
- Infraorder: Cucujiformia
- Family: Cerambycidae
- Genus: Lygistopteroides
- Species: L. longipennis

Binomial name
- Lygistopteroides longipennis (Bates, 1885)

Genus of beetles

Lygistopteroides longipennis is a species of beetle in the family Cerambycidae, the only species in the genus Lygistopteroides.
