= Lycomorphoides =

Lycomorphoides simulans

Scientific classification
- Kingdom: Animalia
- Phylum: Arthropoda
- Class: Insecta
- Order: Coleoptera
- Suborder: Polyphaga
- Infraorder: Cucujiformia
- Family: Cerambycidae
- Genus: Lycomorphoides
- Species: L. simulans

Binomial name
- Lycomorphoides simulans Linsley, 1970

Genus of beetles

Lycomorphoides simulans is a species of beetle in the family Cerambycidae, the only species in the genus Lycomorphoides.
