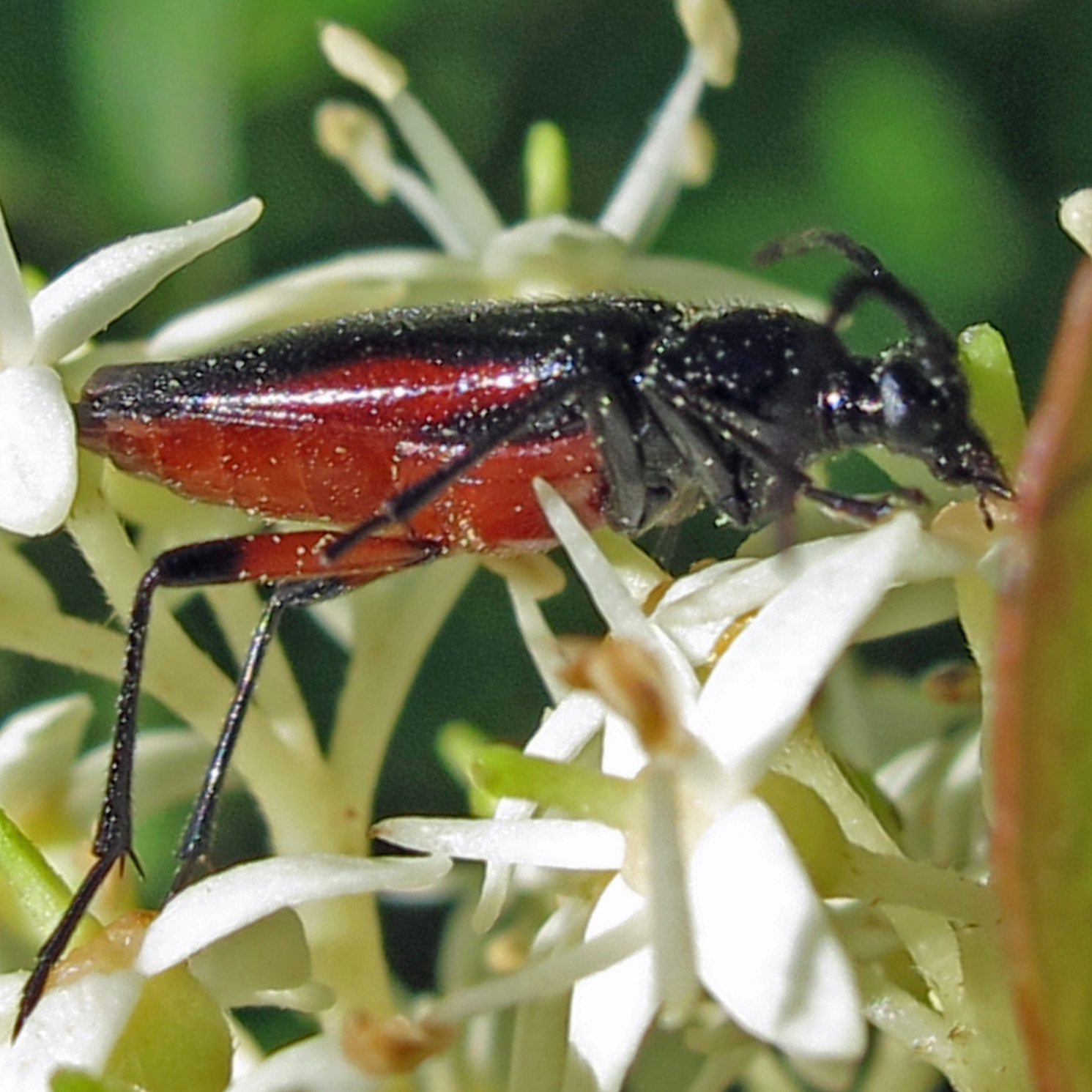
- Pseudostrangalia cruentata

Scientific classification
- Kingdom: Animalia
- Phylum: Arthropoda
- Class: Insecta
- Order: Coleoptera
- Suborder: Polyphaga
- Infraorder: Cucujiformia
- Family: Cerambycidae
- Genus: Pseudostrangalia
- Species: P. cruentata

Binomial name
- Pseudostrangalia cruentata (Haldeman, 1847)

= Pseudostrangalia =

Pseudostrangalia cruentata

Genus of beetles

Pseudostrangalia cruentata is a species of beetle in the family Cerambycidae, the only species in the genus Pseudostrangalia.
