= Ralph Hopping =

American entomologist

- Born: April 8, 1868; New York
- Died: October 29, 1941 (aged 73)
- Occupation: Entomologist

Ralph H. Hopping (April 8, 1868, New York City – October 29, 1941) was an American-born Canadian entomologist who specialized in Coleoptera (beetles and weevils).

== Biography ==
Hopping was born in New York City. From an early age he collected and studied insects, especially Coleoptera. In 1891, he relocated with his father, George W. Hopping, to California.

In 1905, Ralph entered the United States Forest Service. In 1912, he held the post of Forest Entomologist, and was based in San Francisco. In 1919, he was offered, and accepted, the post of Entomologist-in-Charge at the Vernon Laboratory in British Columbia, Canada. He remained at Vernon until he retired in 1939, with the title of Senior Agricultural Scientist. He was a member of several learned societies, including the California Academy of Sciences (from 1913), the Pacific Coast Entomological Society, and the Entomological Society of British Columbia. He collected, and described, numerous species of beetle. He directed his energies not simply towards scientific inquiry, but especially towards control of bark beetles; a notorious pest in the Canadian forestry industry.

In 1948, his widow, Eltha Edwards, donated his beetle collection to the Entomology Department of the California Academy of Sciences.

His son, G. R. Hopping, was an entomologist also.

== Taxa described ==
- Clytus canadensis (1928)
- Judolia swainei (1922)
- Leptura sequoiae (1934)
- Ortholeptura obscura (1928); see Ortholeptura
- Phymatodes fulgidus (1928)
- Pissodes terminalis (date unknown); see Pissodes
- Pidonia quadrata (1931)
- Xylotrechus bowditchi (1928)
- Xylotrechus robustus (1941)

== Taxa named in honor ==
- Atimia hoppingi (Linsley, 1939); see Atimiini
- Callidium hoppingi (Linsley, 1957)
- Pseudopilema hoppingi (Van Dyke, 1920)
