= Ortholeptura insignis =

Scientific classification
- Domain: Eukaryota
- Kingdom: Animalia
- Phylum: Arthropoda
- Class: Insecta
- Order: Coleoptera
- Suborder: Polyphaga
- Infraorder: Cucujiformia
- Family: Cerambycidae
- Genus: Ortholeptura
- Species: O. insignis

Binomial name
- Ortholeptura insignis (Fall, 1907)

Species of beetle

Ortholeptura insignis is a species of flower longhorn in the beetle family Cerambycidae. It is found in Central America and North America.
