= Callidium duodecimsignatum =

Scientific classification
- Domain: Eukaryota
- Kingdom: Animalia
- Phylum: Arthropoda
- Class: Insecta
- Order: Coleoptera
- Suborder: Polyphaga
- Infraorder: Cucujiformia
- Family: Cerambycidae
- Genus: Callidium
- Species: C. duodecimsignatum

Binomial name
- Callidium duodecimsignatum Perroud, 1855

Species of beetle

Callidium duodecimsignatum is a species of beetle in the family Cerambycidae. It was described by Perroud in 1855.
