= Leptura pacifica =

Scientific classification
- Domain: Eukaryota
- Kingdom: Animalia
- Phylum: Arthropoda
- Class: Insecta
- Order: Coleoptera
- Suborder: Polyphaga
- Infraorder: Cucujiformia
- Family: Cerambycidae
- Genus: Leptura
- Species: L. pacifica

Binomial name
- Leptura pacifica (Linsley, 1940)

Species of beetle

Leptura pacifica is a species of beetle in the family Cerambycidae. It was described by Linsley in 1940.
