= Callidium bifasciatum =

Scientific classification
- Kingdom: Animalia
- Phylum: Arthropoda
- Clade: Pancrustacea
- Class: Insecta
- Order: Coleoptera
- Suborder: Polyphaga
- Infraorder: Cucujiformia
- Family: Cerambycidae
- Genus: Callidium
- Species: C. bifasciatum

Binomial name
- Callidium bifasciatum Fabricius, 1787

Species of beetle

Callidium bifasciatum is a species of beetle in the family Cerambycidae. It was described by Johan Christian Fabricius in 1787.
