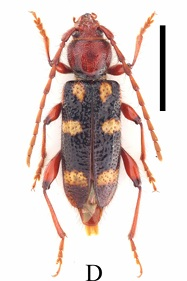

Scientific classification
- Domain: Eukaryota
- Kingdom: Animalia
- Phylum: Arthropoda
- Class: Insecta
- Order: Coleoptera
- Suborder: Polyphaga
- Infraorder: Cucujiformia
- Family: Cerambycidae
- Genus: Callidium
- Species: C. flavosignatum

Binomial name
- Callidium flavosignatum (Pu, 1991)

Synonyms
- Callidiellum flavosignatus Pu, 1991

= Callidium flavosignatum =

Species of beetle

Callidium flavosignatum is a species of beetle of the Cerambycidae family. This species is found in China (Sichuan, Gansu, Qinhai).
