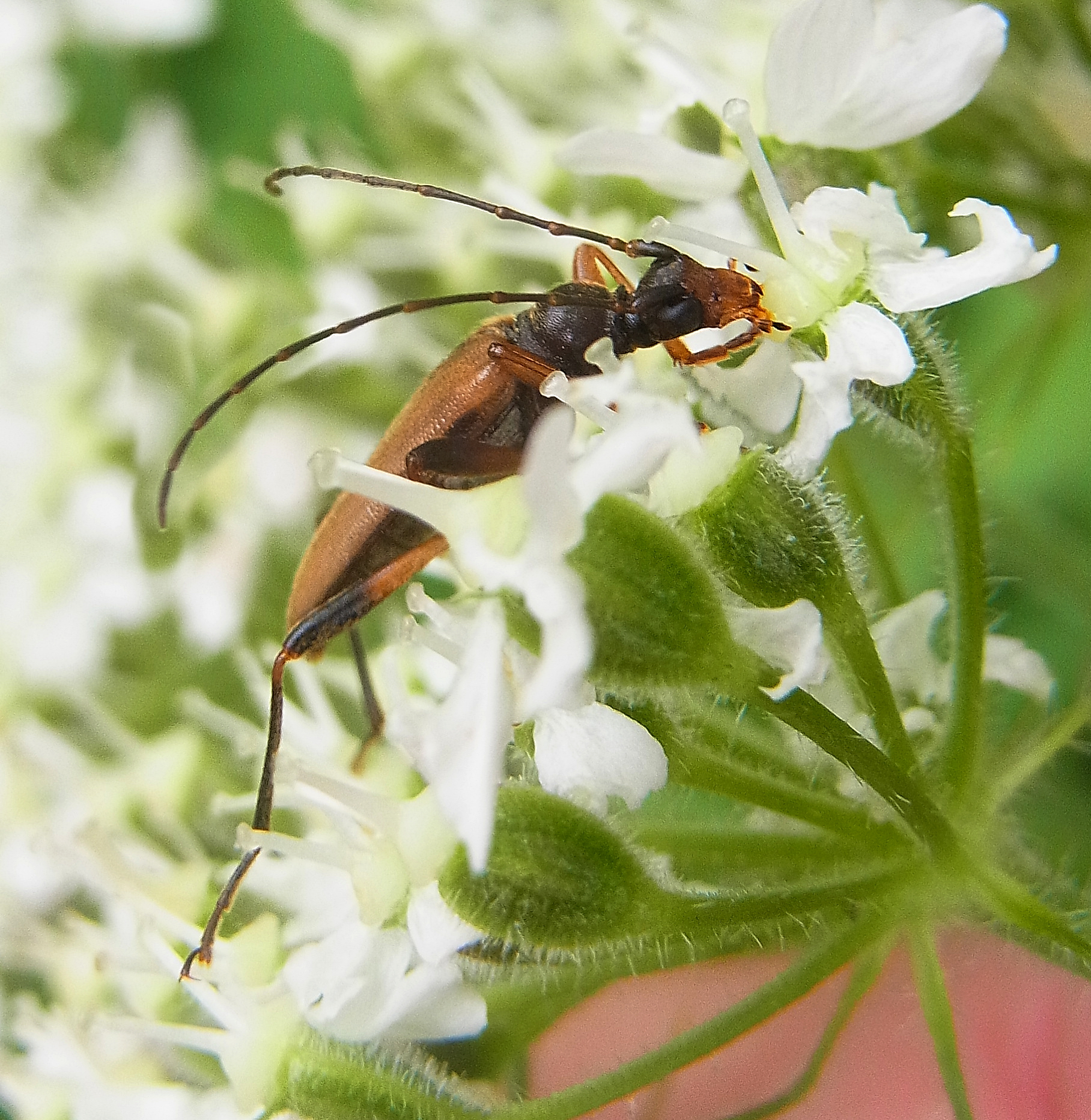

Scientific classification
- Kingdom: Animalia
- Phylum: Arthropoda
- Clade: Pancrustacea
- Class: Insecta
- Order: Coleoptera
- Suborder: Polyphaga
- Infraorder: Cucujiformia
- Family: Cerambycidae
- Genus: Pidonia
- Species: P. lurida

Binomial name
- Pidonia lurida (Fabricius, 1792)

Synonyms
- Leptura lurida Fabricius, 1792; Pidonia rufithorax Pic, 1902

= Pidonia lurida =

Species of beetle

Pidonia lurida is a species of the Lepturinae subfamily in the long-horned beetle family. This beetle is distributed in Central and Southeast Europe, Russia, north of Italy and France. Larvae develop in deciduous and coniferous trees.

== Subtaxons ==
There are three varieties in species:

- Pidonia lurida var. ganglbaueri Ormay
- Pidonia lurida var. notaticollis Pic
- Pidonia lurida var. suturalis Olivier
