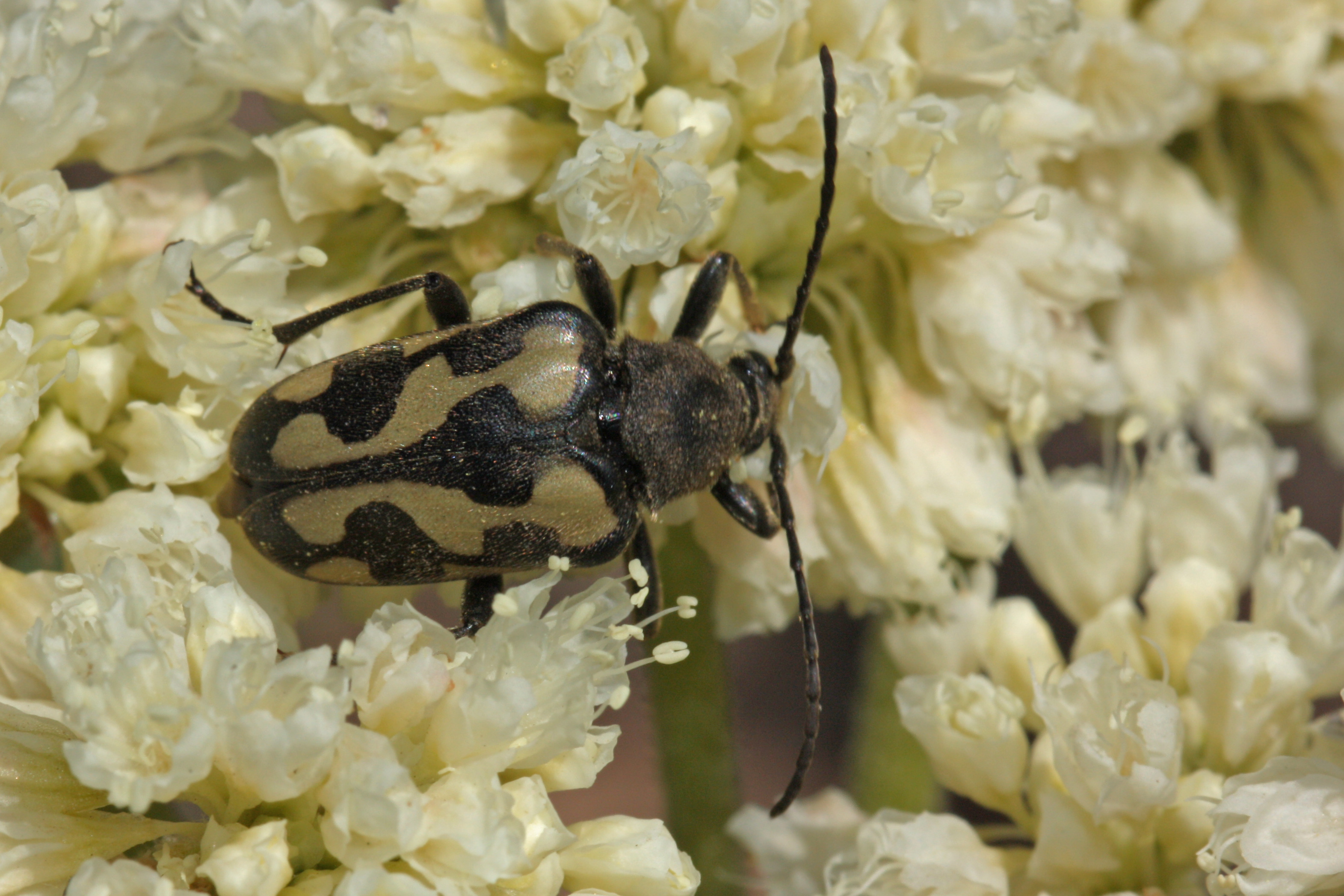
- Judolia instabilis

Scientific classification
- Domain: Eukaryota
- Kingdom: Animalia
- Phylum: Arthropoda
- Class: Insecta
- Order: Coleoptera
- Suborder: Polyphaga
- Infraorder: Cucujiformia
- Family: Cerambycidae
- Tribe: Lepturini
- Genus: Judolia; Mulsant, 1863

Synonyms
- Anoplodera (Judolia) Swaine & Hopping, 1928; Judolia (Pachytodes) Pic, 1891; Leptura (Judolia) Ganglbauer, 1881; Leptura (Pachytodes) Picard, 1929; Pachytodes (Pic) Villiers, 1974

= Judolia =

Genus of beetles

Judolia is a genus of beetles in the family Cerambycidae, containing the following species:

- Judolia antecurrens (Wickham, 1913)†
- Judolia cometes (Bates, 1884)
- Judolia cordifera (Olivier, 1795)
- Judolia gaurotoides (Casey, 1893)
- Judolia impura (LeConte, 1857)
- Judolia instabilis (Haldeman, 1847)
- Judolia japonica (Tamanuki, 1942)
- Judolia longipes (Gebler, 1832)
- Judolia montivagans (Couper, 1864)
- Judolia quadrata (LeConte, 1873)
- Judolia scapularis (Van Dyke, 1920)
- Judolia sexmaculata (Linnaeus, 1758)
- Judolia sexspilota (LeConte, 1859)
- Judolia swainei (Hopping, 1922)
