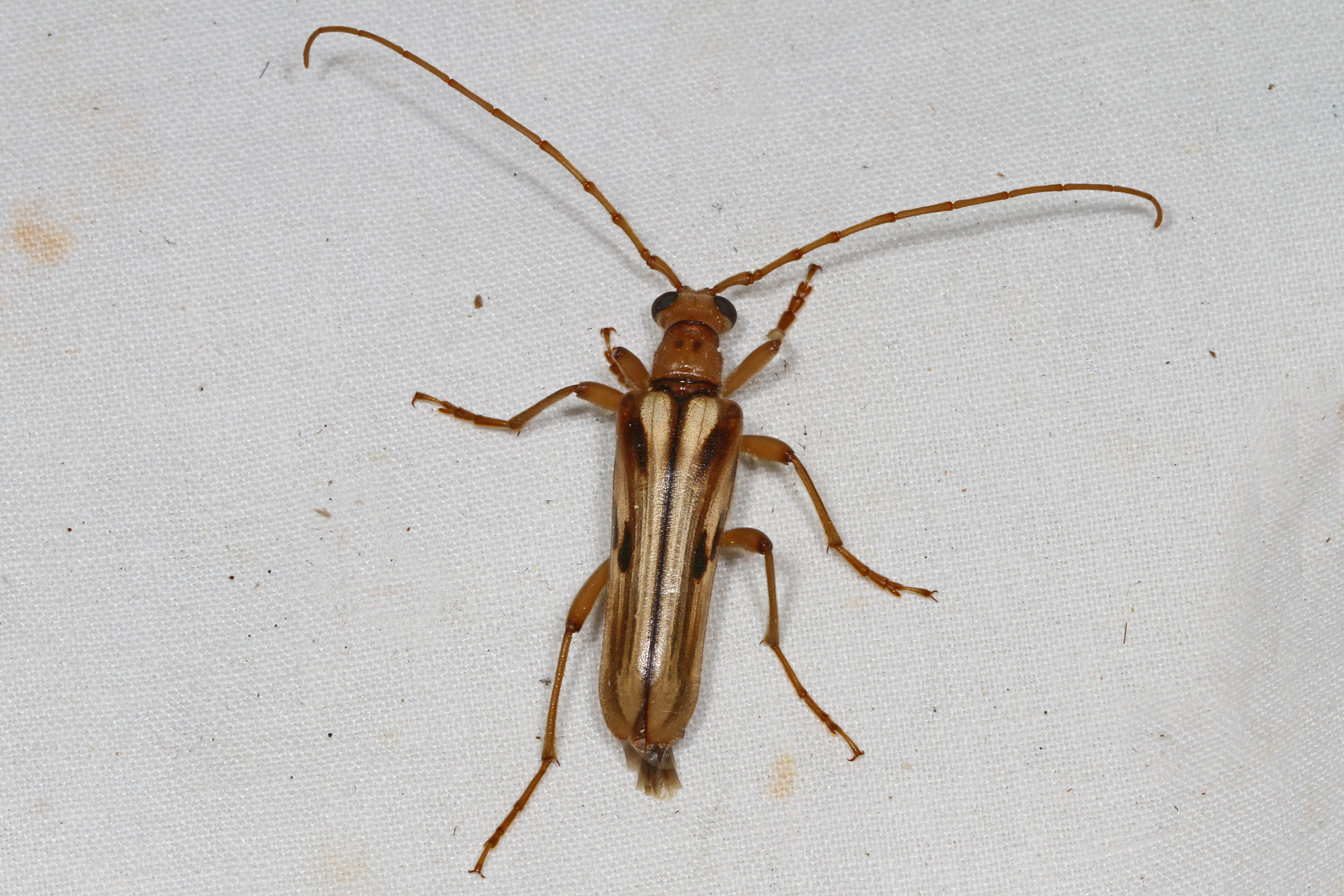
- Ortholeptura valida

Scientific classification
- Kingdom: Animalia
- Phylum: Arthropoda
- Class: Insecta
- Order: Coleoptera
- Suborder: Polyphaga
- Infraorder: Cucujiformia
- Family: Cerambycidae
- Tribe: Lepturini
- Genus: Ortholeptura

= Ortholeptura =

Genus of beetles

Ortholeptura is a genus of beetles in the family Cerambycidae, containing the following species:

- Ortholeptura insignis (Fall, 1907)
- Ortholeptura obscura (Swaine & Hopping, 1928)
- Ortholeptura valida (LeConte, 1857)
