= Pidonia densicollis =

Scientific classification
- Domain: Eukaryota
- Kingdom: Animalia
- Phylum: Arthropoda
- Class: Insecta
- Order: Coleoptera
- Suborder: Polyphaga
- Infraorder: Cucujiformia
- Family: Cerambycidae
- Genus: Pidonia
- Species: P. densicollis

Binomial name
- Pidonia densicollis (Casey, 1914)

Species of beetle

Pidonia densicollis is a species of the Lepturinae subfamily in the long-horned beetle family. This beetle is distributed in the United States.
