= Judolia scapularis =

Scientific classification
- Domain: Eukaryota
- Kingdom: Animalia
- Phylum: Arthropoda
- Class: Insecta
- Order: Coleoptera
- Suborder: Polyphaga
- Infraorder: Cucujiformia
- Family: Cerambycidae
- Genus: Judolia
- Species: J. scapularis

Binomial name
- Judolia scapularis (Van Dyke, 1920)

Species of beetle

Judolia scapularis is a species of beetle in the family Cerambycidae. It was described by Van Dyke in 1920.
