= Judolia impura =

Scientific classification
- Domain: Eukaryota
- Kingdom: Animalia
- Phylum: Arthropoda
- Class: Insecta
- Order: Coleoptera
- Suborder: Polyphaga
- Infraorder: Cucujiformia
- Family: Cerambycidae
- Genus: Judolia
- Species: J. impura

Binomial name
- Judolia impura (LeConte, 1857)

Species of beetle

Judolia impura is a species of beetle in the family Cerambycidae. It was described by John Lawrence LeConte in 1857.
