= Judolia longipes =

Scientific classification
- Domain: Eukaryota
- Kingdom: Animalia
- Phylum: Arthropoda
- Class: Insecta
- Order: Coleoptera
- Suborder: Polyphaga
- Infraorder: Cucujiformia
- Family: Cerambycidae
- Genus: Judolia
- Species: J. longipes

Binomial name
- Judolia longipes (Gebler, 1832)

Species of beetle

Judolia longipes is a species of beetle in the family Cerambycidae. It was described by Gebler in 1832.
