= Xylotrechus bowditchi =

Scientific classification
- Kingdom: Animalia
- Phylum: Arthropoda
- Clade: Pancrustacea
- Class: Insecta
- Order: Coleoptera
- Suborder: Polyphaga
- Infraorder: Cucujiformia
- Family: Cerambycidae
- Genus: Xylotrechus
- Species: X. bowditchi

Binomial name
- Xylotrechus bowditchi Hopping, 1928

Species of beetle

Xylotrechus bowditchi is a species of beetle in the family Cerambycidae. It was first described by Ralph Hopping in 1928.
