= Callidium pseudotsugae =

Scientific classification
- Domain: Eukaryota
- Kingdom: Animalia
- Phylum: Arthropoda
- Class: Insecta
- Order: Coleoptera
- Suborder: Polyphaga
- Infraorder: Cucujiformia
- Family: Cerambycidae
- Genus: Callidium
- Species: C. pseudotsugae

Binomial name
- Callidium pseudotsugae Fisher, 1920

Species of beetle

Callidium pseudotsugae is a species of beetle in the family Cerambycidae. It was described by Fisher in 1920.
