= Pidonia aurata =

Scientific classification
- Kingdom: Animalia
- Phylum: Arthropoda
- Clade: Pancrustacea
- Class: Insecta
- Order: Coleoptera
- Suborder: Polyphaga
- Infraorder: Cucujiformia
- Family: Cerambycidae
- Genus: Pidonia
- Species: P. aurata

Binomial name
- Pidonia aurata (Horn, 1860)

Species of beetle

Pidonia aurata is a species of the Lepturinae subfamily in the long-horned beetle family, found in transition zones between ponderosa pine forest and pinyon-juniper-oak woodland at elevations around 7000 ft, specifically associated with open and sunny conditions in montane areas with diverse flowering vegetation. This beetle is distributed in the western United States, particularly recorded from northern Arizona in Coconino County and the Kaibab Plateau area.
