= Callidium viridocyaneum =

Scientific classification
- Domain: Eukaryota
- Kingdom: Animalia
- Phylum: Arthropoda
- Class: Insecta
- Order: Coleoptera
- Suborder: Polyphaga
- Infraorder: Cucujiformia
- Family: Cerambycidae
- Genus: Callidium
- Species: C. viridocyaneum

Binomial name
- Callidium viridocyaneum Chemsak & Linsley, 1963

Species of beetle

Callidium viridocyaneum is a species of beetle in the family Cerambycidae. It was described by Chemsak & Linsley in 1963.
