= Callidium rufipenne =

Scientific classification
- Domain: Eukaryota
- Kingdom: Animalia
- Phylum: Arthropoda
- Class: Insecta
- Order: Coleoptera
- Suborder: Polyphaga
- Infraorder: Cucujiformia
- Family: Cerambycidae
- Genus: Callidium
- Species: C. rufipenne

Binomial name
- Callidium rufipenne Motschulsky, 1860

Species of beetle

Callidium rufipenne is a species of beetle in the family Cerambycidae. It was described by Victor Motschulsky in 1860.
