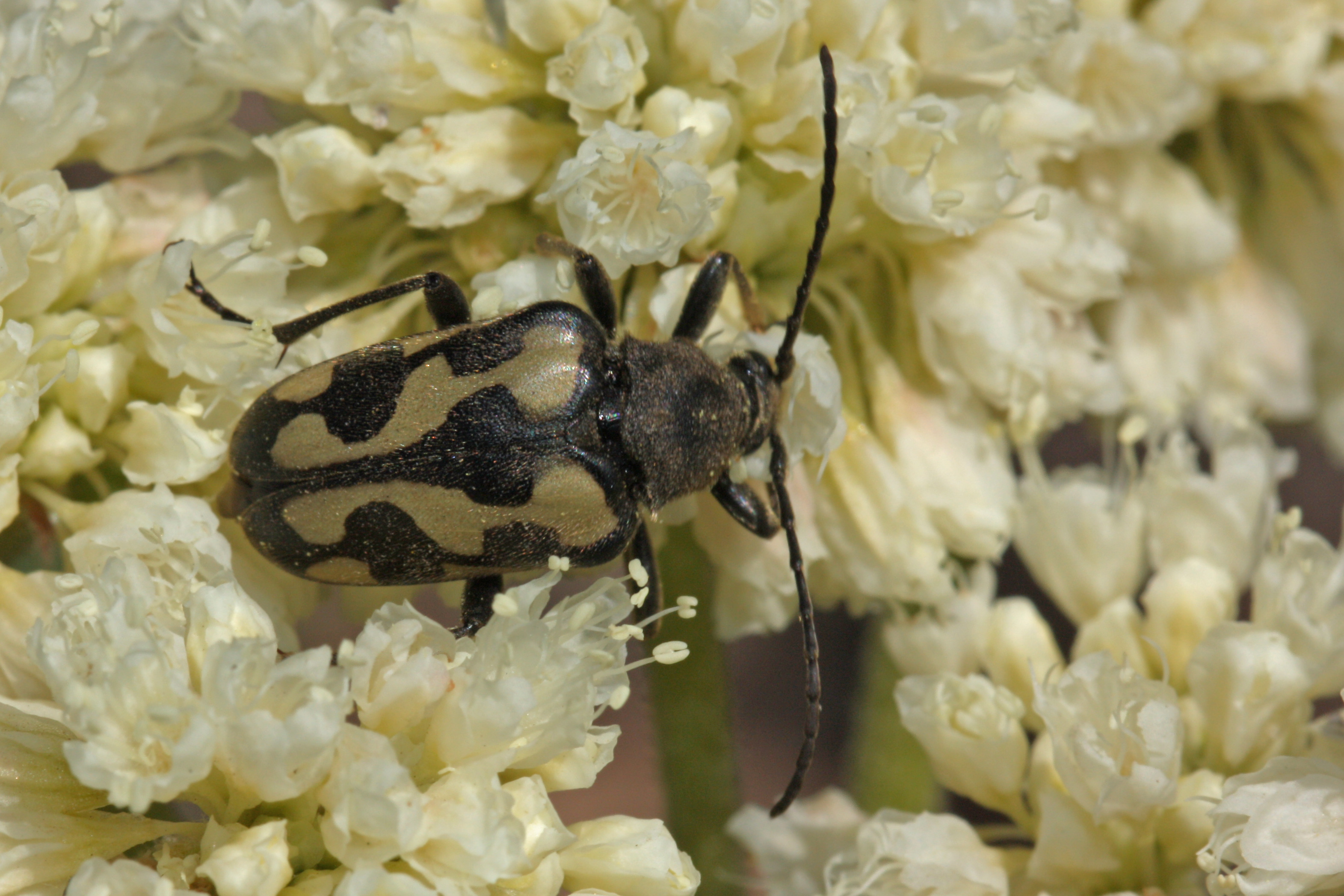

Scientific classification
- Domain: Eukaryota
- Kingdom: Animalia
- Phylum: Arthropoda
- Class: Insecta
- Order: Coleoptera
- Suborder: Polyphaga
- Infraorder: Cucujiformia
- Family: Cerambycidae
- Genus: Judolia
- Species: J. instabilis

Binomial name
- Judolia instabilis (Haldeman, 1847)

= Judolia instabilis =

Species of beetle

Judolia instabilis is a species of beetle in the family Cerambycidae. It was described by Haldeman in 1847. Their appearance ranges from black with yellow spots to full black in color. They range in size from 6 mm to 15 mm in length. They inhabit the U.S and Canada.
