= Leptura sequoiae =

Scientific classification
- Kingdom: Animalia
- Phylum: Arthropoda
- Clade: Pancrustacea
- Class: Insecta
- Order: Coleoptera
- Suborder: Polyphaga
- Infraorder: Cucujiformia
- Family: Cerambycidae
- Genus: Leptura
- Species: L. sequoiae

Binomial name
- Leptura sequoiae (Hopping, 1934)

Species of beetle

Leptura sequoiae is a species of beetle in the family Cerambycidae. It was described by Hopping in 1934.
