= Judolia swainei =

Scientific classification
- Kingdom: Animalia
- Phylum: Arthropoda
- Clade: Pancrustacea
- Class: Insecta
- Order: Coleoptera
- Suborder: Polyphaga
- Infraorder: Cucujiformia
- Family: Cerambycidae
- Genus: Judolia
- Species: J. swainei

Binomial name
- Judolia swainei (Hopping, 1922)

Species of beetle

Judolia swainei is a species of beetle in the family Cerambycidae. It was described by Hopping in 1922.

This species is distributed in:

- Mexico
- United States

A subspecies belonging to this species can be found: J. s. jacintana.
