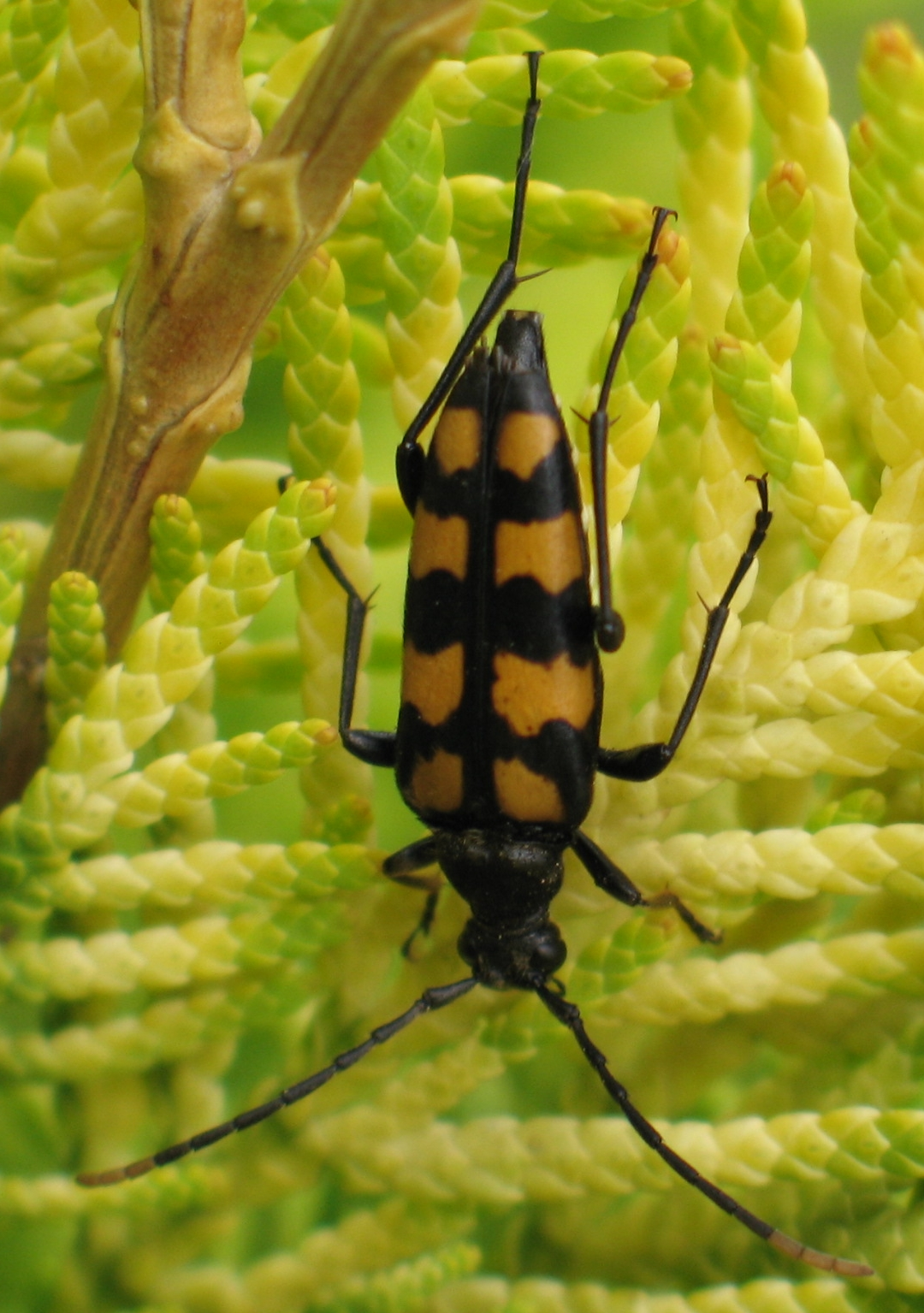
- Leptura quadrifasciata (female)

Scientific classification
- Kingdom: Animalia
- Phylum: Arthropoda
- Class: Insecta
- Order: Coleoptera
- Suborder: Polyphaga
- Infraorder: Cucujiformia
- Family: Cerambycidae
- Subfamily: Lepturinae
- Tribe: Lepturini
- Genus: Leptura; Linnaeus, 1758

Synonyms
- Nakanea Ohbayashi 1963; Stenura Haldeman 1847; Strangaliella Hayashi 1976; Strangalia LeConte 1850

= Leptura =

Genus of beetles

Leptura is a genus of beetles in the family Cerambycidae, containing the following species:

- Leptura abdominalis (Haldeman, 1847)
- Leptura adami Hergovits 2020
- Leptura aethiops (Poda 1761)
- Leptura akitai Fujita 2018
- Leptura alticola Gressitt, 1948
- Leptura amamiana Hayashi 1960
- Leptura ambulatrix (Gressitt, 1951)
- Leptura annularis Fabricius, 1801
- Leptura arcifera (Blanchard, 1871)
- Leptura atrimembris (Pic, 1923)
- Leptura auratopilosa (Matsushita, 1931)
- Leptura aureolella Holzschuh 2009
- Leptura aurosericans Fairmaire, 1895
- Leptura aurulenta Fabricius, 1792
- Leptura barkamica Holzschuh, 1998
- Leptura bocakorum Holzschuh, 1998
- Leptura cordis Hayashi & Villiers 1985
- Leptura daliensis Holzschuh, 1998
- Leptura dembickyi Hergovits 2020
- Leptura dimorpha Bates 1873
- Leptura doii (Matsushita, 1933)
- Leptura duodecimguttata Fabricius, 1801
- Leptura formosomontana Kano, 1933
- Leptura gorodinskii Hergovits 2020
- Leptura gradatula Holzschuh, 2006
- Leptura grahamiana Gressitt, 1938
- Leptura guerryi Pic, 1902
- Leptura hovorei Linsley & Chemsak, 1976
- Leptura jendeki Hergovits 2020
- Leptura kabateki Hergovits 2020
- Leptura kerniana Fall, 1907
- Leptura kopai Tichy, Viktora & Ohbayashi 2019
- Leptura kubani Holzschuh, 2006
- Leptura kurinai Hergovits 2020
- Leptura kusamai Ohbayashi & Nakane, 1955
- Leptura latipennis Matsushita, 1933
- Leptura lavinia Gahan, 1906
- Leptura linwenhsini Ohbayshi & Chou, 2013
- Leptura longeattenuata Pic, 1939
- Leptura marceli Hergovits 2020
- Leptura masegakii (Kano, 1933)
- Leptura mimica Bates, 1884
- Leptura modicenotata (Pic, 1901)
- Leptura naxi Holzschuh, 1998
- Leptura nigroguttata (Pic, 1927)
- Leptura ochraceofasciata Motschulsky, 1861
- Leptura pacifica (Linsley, 1940)
- Leptura petramarketae Viktora & Hergovits 2021
- †Leptura petrorum Wickham, 1912
- †Leptura ponderosissima Wickham, 1913
- Leptura quadrifasciata Linnaeus, 1758
- Leptura quadrizona (Fairmaire, 1902)
- Leptura regalis (Bates, 1884)
- Leptura rufoannulata (Pic, 1933)
- Leptura semiannulata (Pic, 1916)
- Leptura semicornis Holzschuh, 2003
- Leptura sequoiae (Hopping, 1934)
- Leptura submarginata Pic 1920
- Leptura subtilis Bates, 1884
- Leptura taranan (Kano, 1933)
- Leptura tattakana (Kano, 1933)
- Leptura viktorai Hergovits 2020
- Leptura yakushimana Tamanuki, 1942
- Leptura yulongshana Holzschuh, 1991
- Leptura zonifera (Blanchard, 1871)
