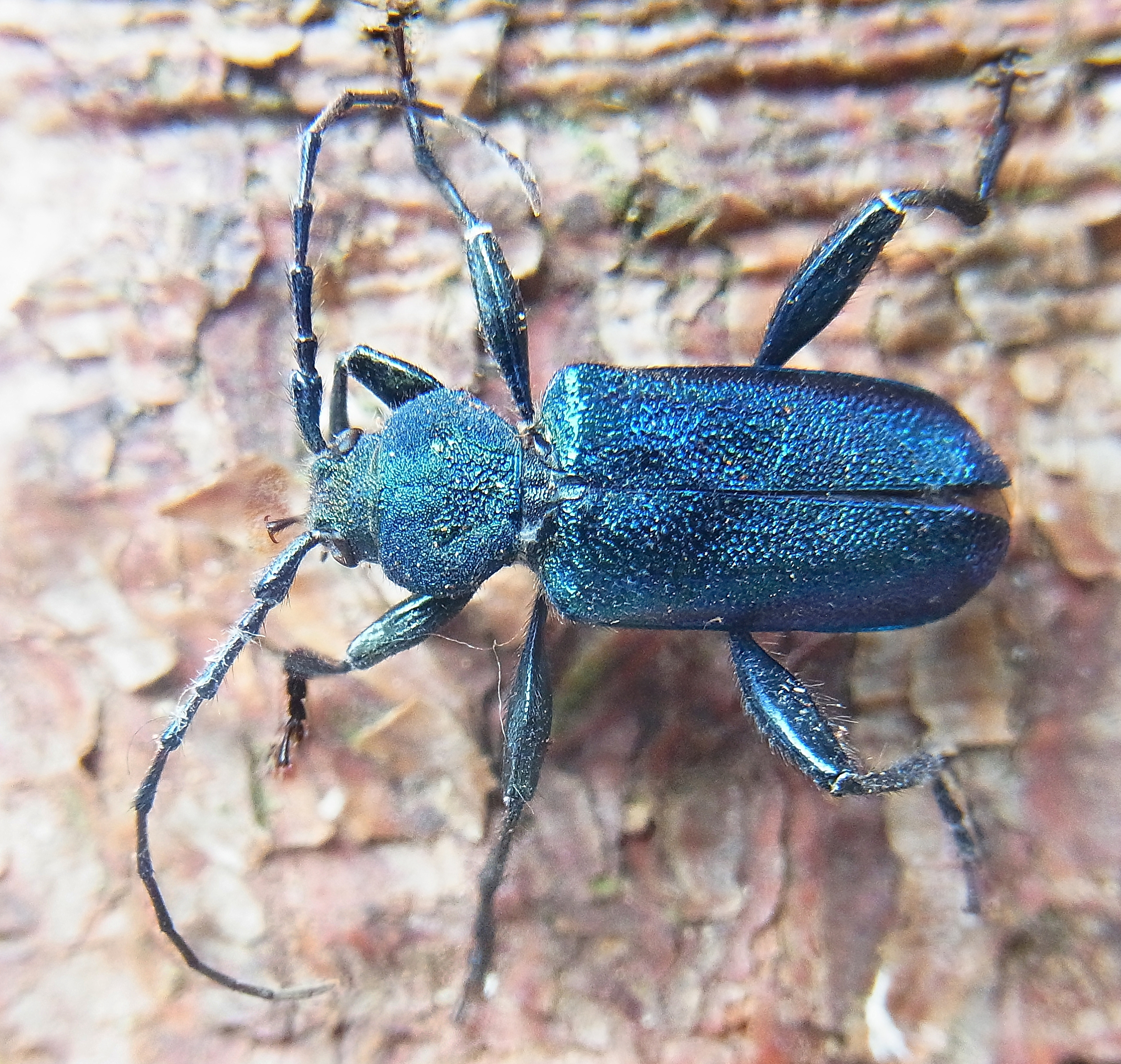

Scientific classification
- Kingdom: Animalia
- Phylum: Arthropoda
- Clade: Pancrustacea
- Class: Insecta
- Order: Coleoptera
- Suborder: Polyphaga
- Infraorder: Cucujiformia
- Family: Cerambycidae
- Genus: Callidium
- Species: C. violaceum

Binomial name
- Callidium violaceum (Linnaeus, 1758)

= Callidium violaceum =

Species of beetle

Callidium violaceum, commonly known as the violet tanbark beetle, is a species of beetle in the family Cerambycidae. It was described by Carl Linnaeus in his landmark 1758 10th edition of Systema Naturae. It is a medium-sized (8–16 mm), broad, black longhorn beetle, with wing covers that have a blue-violet metallic sheen, making the species easy to recognize. Callidium aeneum looks similar but has a green metallic sheen. The antennae are about half the length of the body. The pronotum is wider than long, with rounded sides, coarsely punctured, and with fairly long, erect, dark hairs. The wing covers are coarsely and densely punctured, but not wrinkled, with short hairs and a distinct metallic shine. The legs are black, the thighs slightly thickened, otherwise slender. The larvae develop under the bark of dead spruce and pine. If you use materials with leftover bark as building material, the species can also attack these, and it can live indoors for several generations. It’s also common for it to get into homes with conifer firewood. Since the species can look like the house longhorn beetle (Hylotrupes bajulus), this can cause a lot of concern, but it’s not such a serious pest since the larvae don’t bore deep into the wood. Problems can be avoided if all materials used are thoroughly cleaned of bark. Larval development takes two years. Outdoors the adults are seen in June-July; indoors, they can appear over a longer period.In Norway it seems to be quite uncommon in forests, the most common habitat is stacks of firewood stored under a roof.
