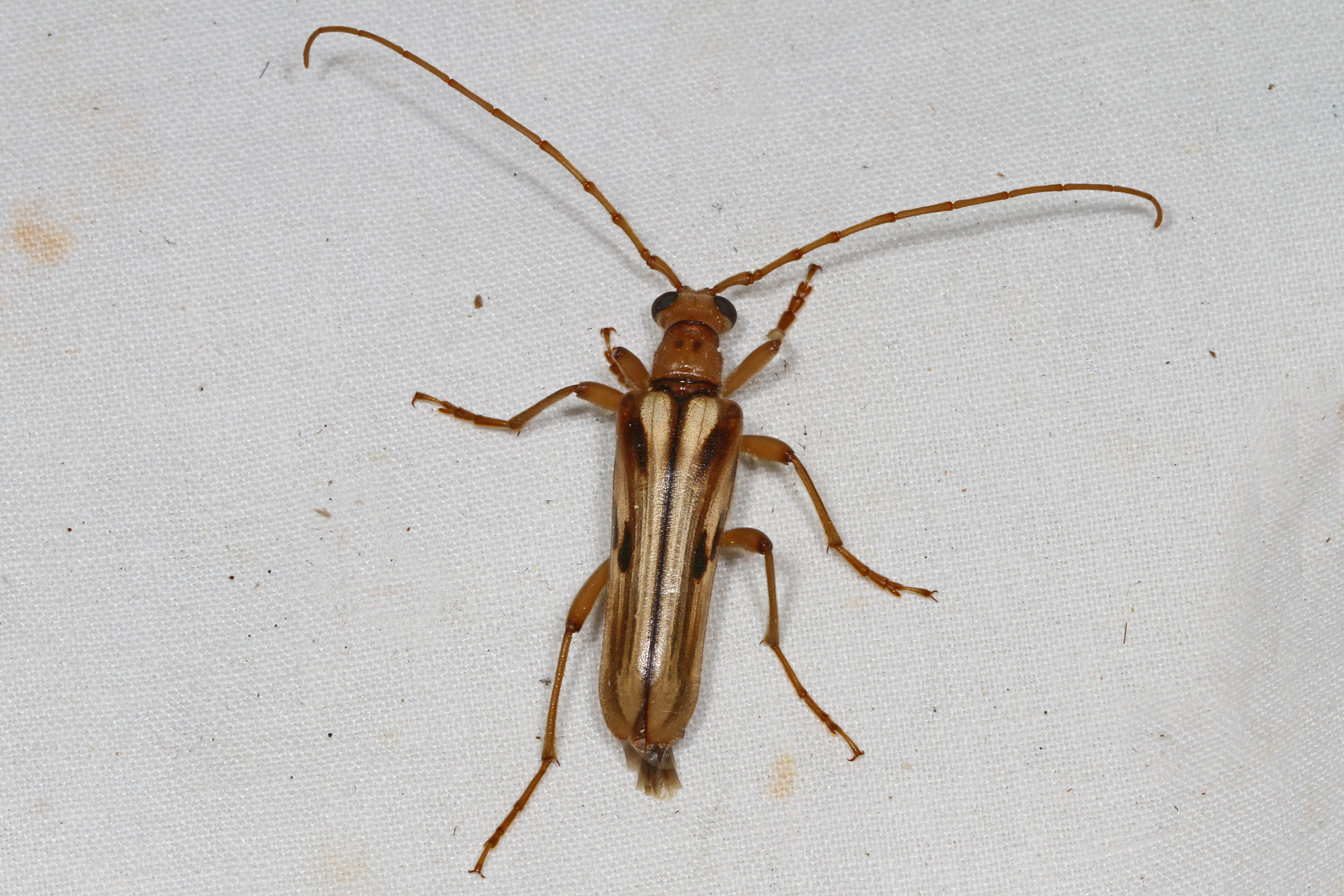

Scientific classification
- Domain: Eukaryota
- Kingdom: Animalia
- Phylum: Arthropoda
- Class: Insecta
- Order: Coleoptera
- Suborder: Polyphaga
- Infraorder: Cucujiformia
- Family: Cerambycidae
- Genus: Ortholeptura
- Species: O. valida

Binomial name
- Ortholeptura valida (LeConte, 1857)

Synonyms
- Ortholeptura oculea Casey, 1913

= Ortholeptura valida =

Species of beetle

Ortholeptura valida is a species of flower longhorn in the beetle family Cerambycidae. It is found in North America.
