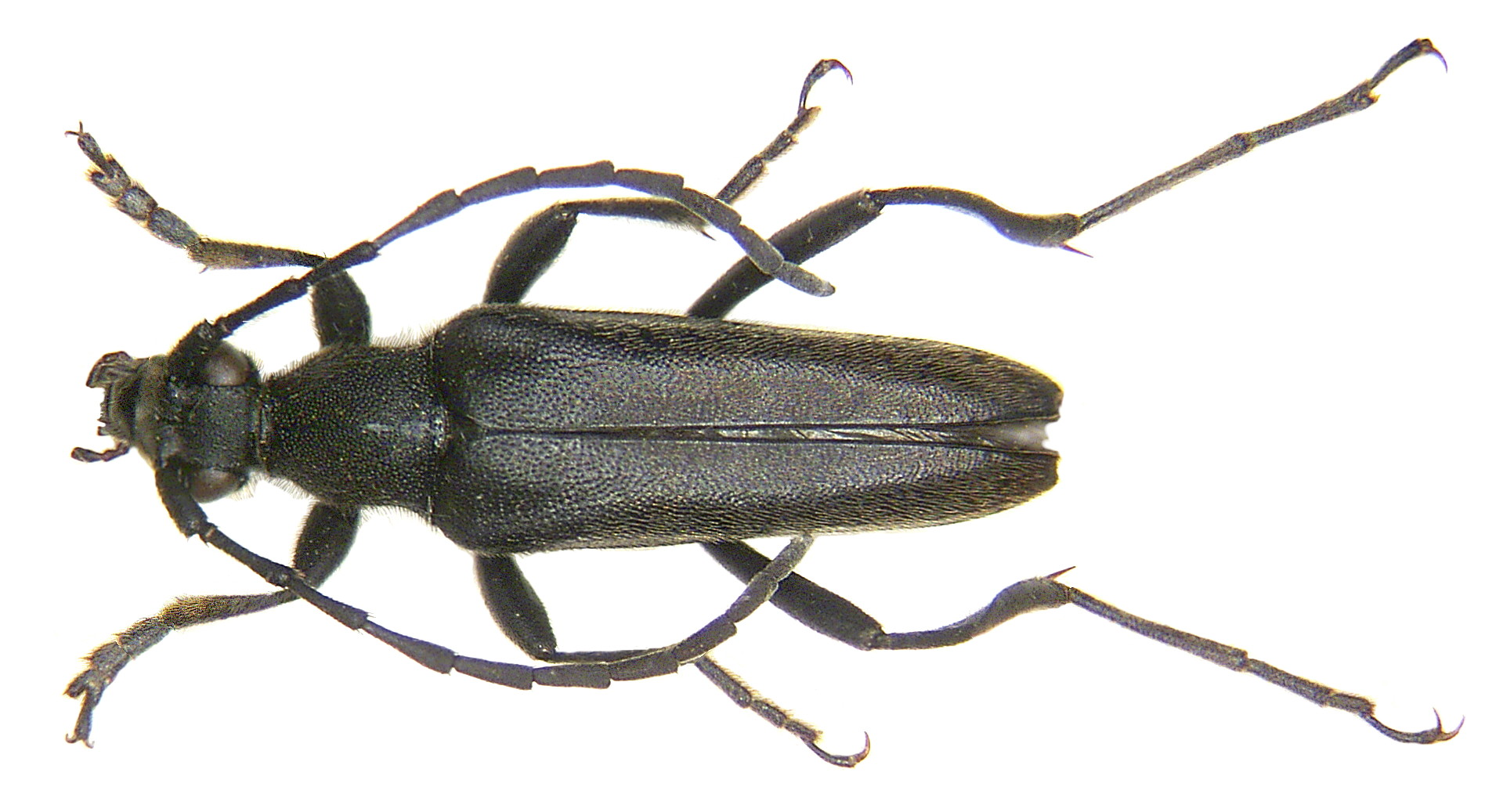

Scientific classification
- Domain: Eukaryota
- Kingdom: Animalia
- Phylum: Arthropoda
- Class: Insecta
- Order: Coleoptera
- Suborder: Polyphaga
- Infraorder: Cucujiformia
- Family: Cerambycidae
- Genus: Leptura
- Species: L. aethiops

Binomial name
- Leptura aethiops (Poda, 1761)

= Leptura aethiops =

Species of beetle

Leptura aethiops, the European longhorn beetle, is a species of beetle in the family Cerambycidae. It was described by Poda in 1761.
