= Callidium fulvicolle =

Scientific classification
- Kingdom: Animalia
- Phylum: Arthropoda
- Clade: Pancrustacea
- Class: Insecta
- Order: Coleoptera
- Suborder: Polyphaga
- Infraorder: Cucujiformia
- Family: Cerambycidae
- Genus: Callidium
- Species: C. fulvicolle

Binomial name
- Callidium fulvicolle Fabricius, 1792

Species of beetle

Callidium fulvicolle is a species of beetle in the family Cerambycidae. It was described by Johan Christian Fabricius in 1792.
