= Pidonia quadrata =

Scientific classification
- Kingdom: Animalia
- Phylum: Arthropoda
- Clade: Pancrustacea
- Class: Insecta
- Order: Coleoptera
- Suborder: Polyphaga
- Infraorder: Cucujiformia
- Family: Cerambycidae
- Genus: Pidonia
- Species: P. quadrata

Binomial name
- Pidonia quadrata (Hopping, 1931)

Species of beetle

Pidonia quadrata is a species of the Lepturinae subfamily in the long-horned beetle family. This beetle is distributed in Canada, and the United States.
