= Callidium biguttatum =

Scientific classification
- Domain: Eukaryota
- Kingdom: Animalia
- Phylum: Arthropoda
- Class: Insecta
- Order: Coleoptera
- Suborder: Polyphaga
- Infraorder: Cucujiformia
- Family: Cerambycidae
- Genus: Callidium
- Species: C. biguttatum

Binomial name
- Callidium biguttatum Salé, 1865

Species of beetle

Callidium biguttatum is a species of beetle in the family Cerambycidae. It was described by Salé in 1865.
