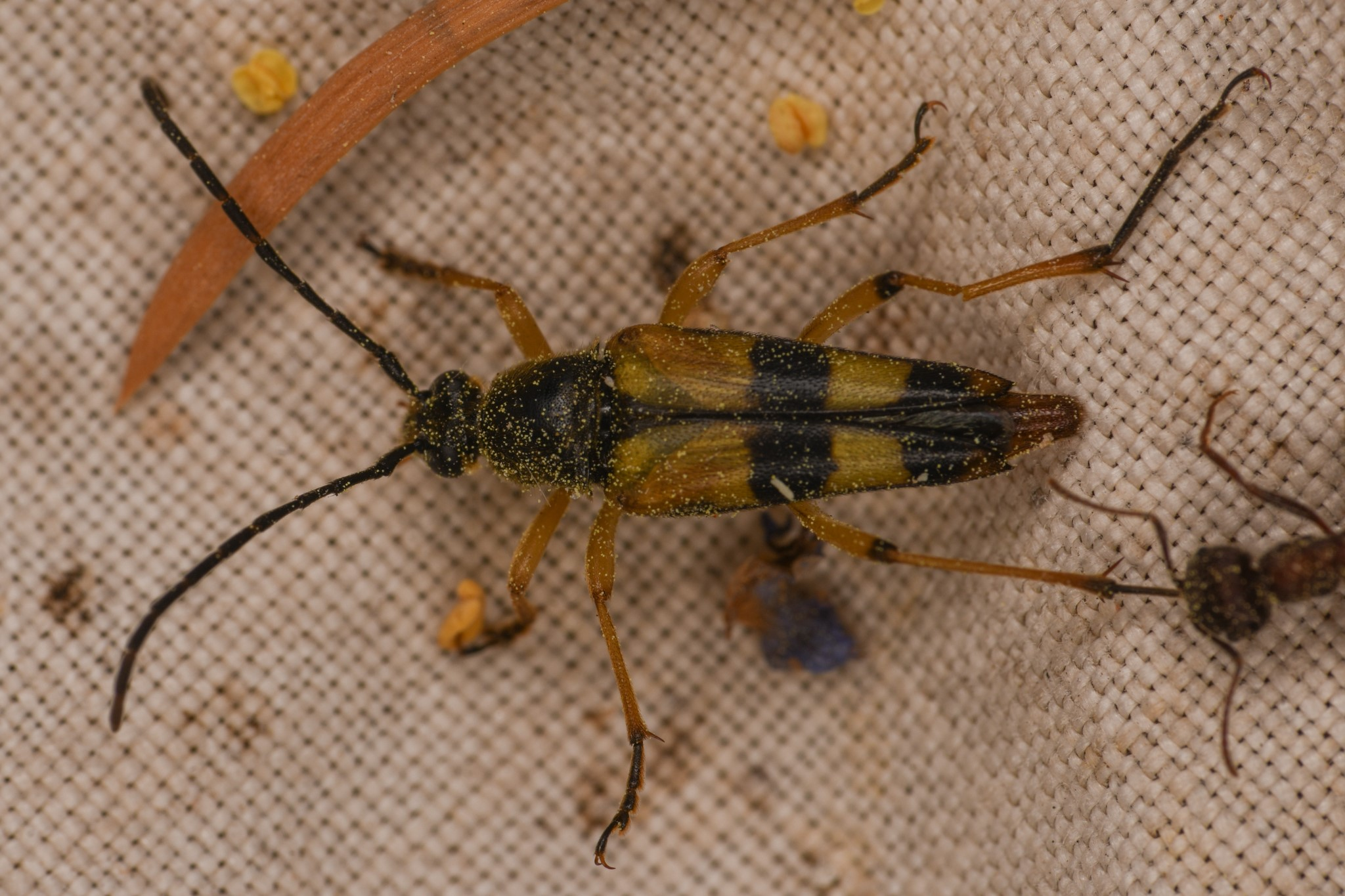

Scientific classification
- Domain: Eukaryota
- Kingdom: Animalia
- Phylum: Arthropoda
- Class: Insecta
- Order: Coleoptera
- Suborder: Polyphaga
- Infraorder: Cucujiformia
- Family: Cerambycidae
- Genus: Leptura
- Species: L. hovorei

Binomial name
- Leptura hovorei Linsley & Chemsak, 1976

= Leptura hovorei =

Species of beetle

Leptura hovorei is a species of beetle in the family Cerambycidae. It was first described by Linsley and Chemsak in 1976.
