= Callidium californicum =

Scientific classification
- Kingdom: Animalia
- Phylum: Arthropoda
- Class: Insecta
- Order: Coleoptera
- Suborder: Polyphaga
- Infraorder: Cucujiformia
- Family: Cerambycidae
- Genus: Callidium
- Species: C. californicum

Binomial name
- Callidium californicum Casey, 1912

Species of beetle

Callidium californicum is a species of beetle in the family Cerambycidae. It was described by Casey in 1912.
