= Callidium violaceipenne =

Scientific classification
- Domain: Eukaryota
- Kingdom: Animalia
- Phylum: Arthropoda
- Class: Insecta
- Order: Coleoptera
- Suborder: Polyphaga
- Infraorder: Cucujiformia
- Family: Cerambycidae
- Genus: Callidium
- Species: C. violaceipenne

Binomial name
- Callidium violaceipenne Chemsak & Linsley, 1963

Species of beetle

Callidium violaceipenne is a species of beetle in the family Cerambycidae. It was described by Chemsak & Linsley in 1963.
