= Callidium frigidum =

Scientific classification
- Kingdom: Animalia
- Phylum: Arthropoda
- Class: Insecta
- Order: Coleoptera
- Suborder: Polyphaga
- Infraorder: Cucujiformia
- Family: Cerambycidae
- Genus: Callidium
- Species: C. frigidum

Binomial name
- Callidium frigidum Casey, 1912

Species of beetle

Callidium frigidum is a species of beetle in the family Cerambycidae. It was described by Casey in 1912.
