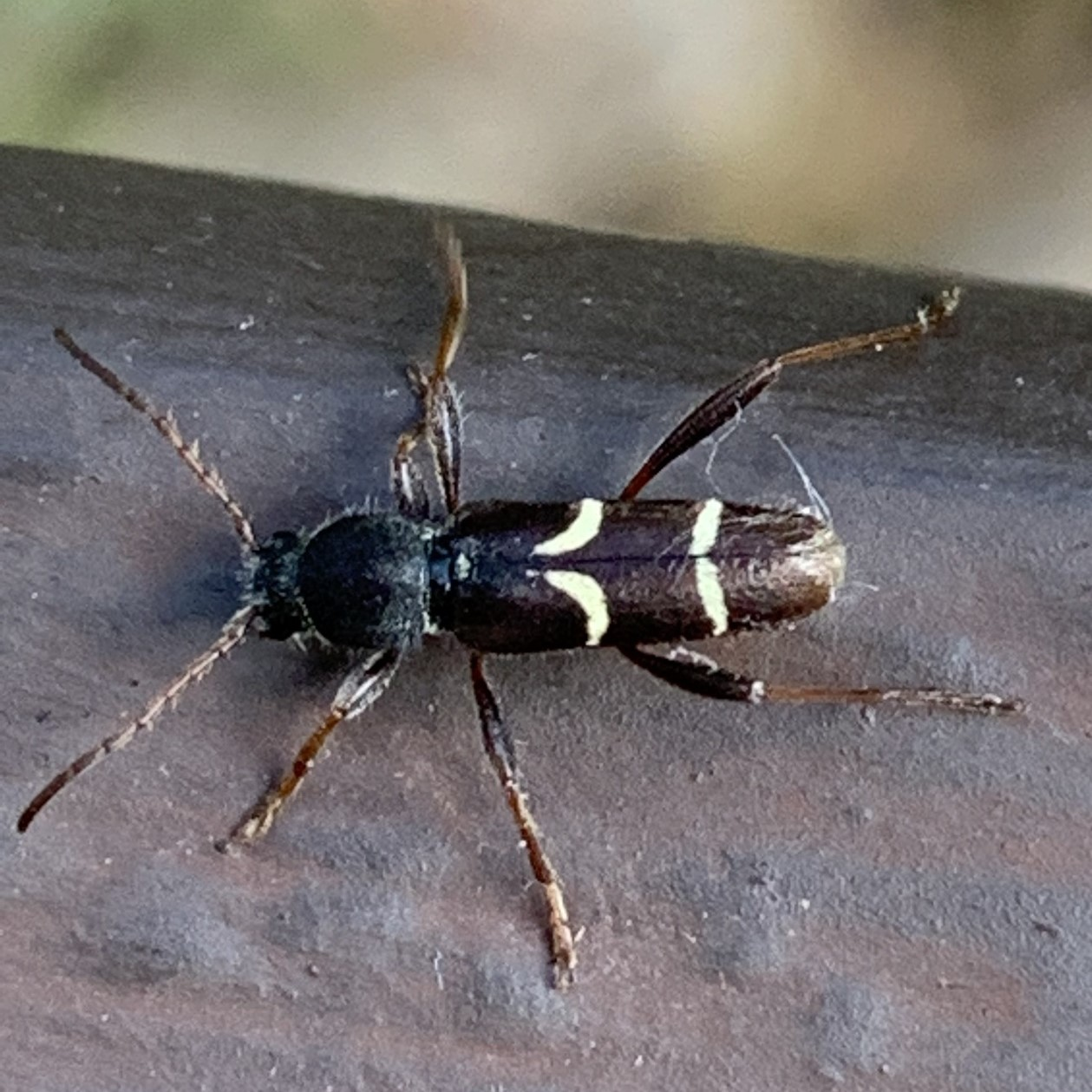

Scientific classification
- Kingdom: Animalia
- Phylum: Arthropoda
- Clade: Pancrustacea
- Class: Insecta
- Order: Coleoptera
- Suborder: Polyphaga
- Infraorder: Cucujiformia
- Family: Cerambycidae
- Genus: Clytus
- Species: C. canadensis

Binomial name
- Clytus canadensis Hopping, 1928

= Clytus canadensis =

Species of beetle

Clytus canadensis is a species of beetle in the family Cerambycidae. It was first described by Ralph Hopping in 1928.
