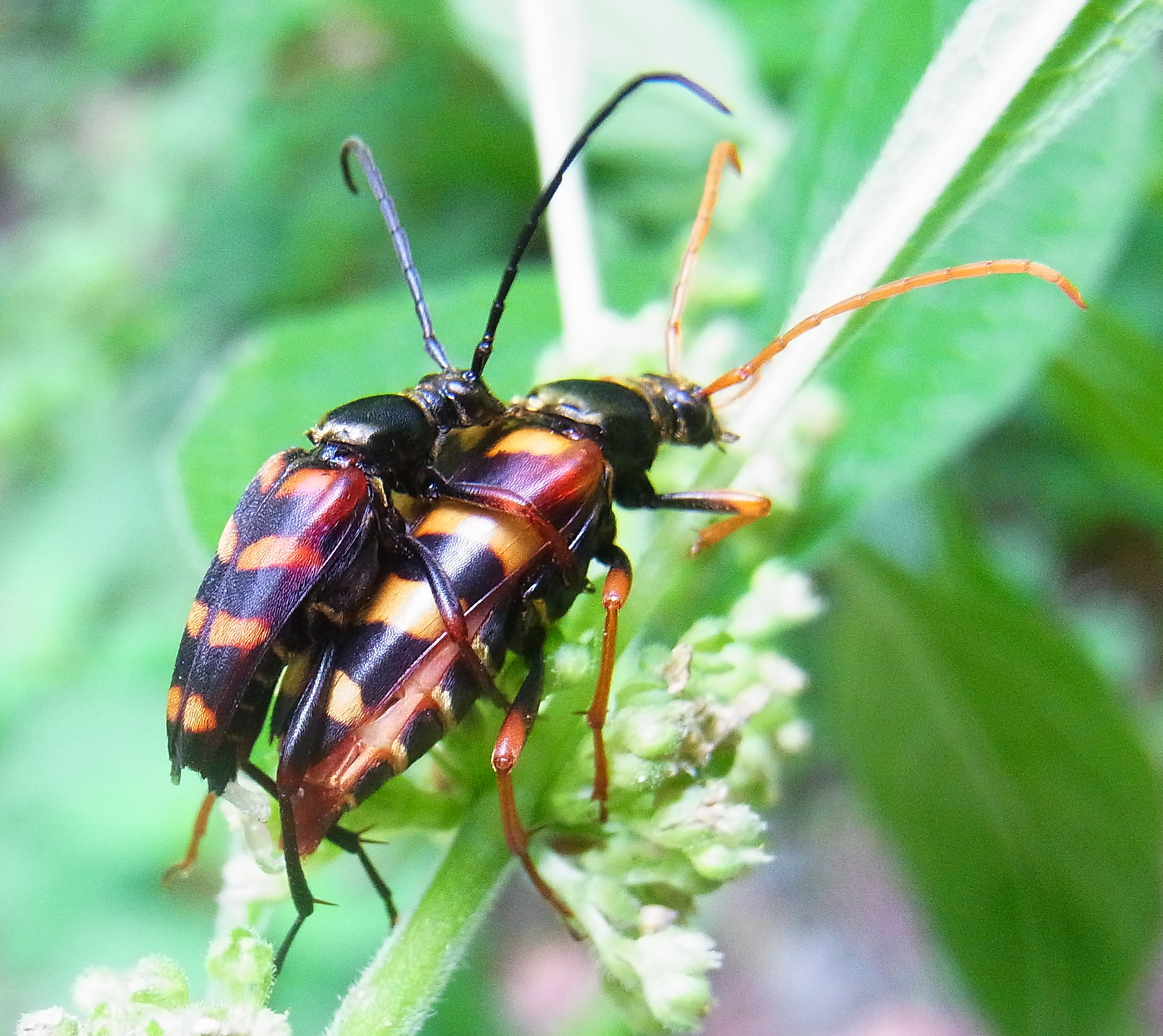

Scientific classification
- Kingdom: Animalia
- Phylum: Arthropoda
- Clade: Pancrustacea
- Class: Insecta
- Order: Coleoptera
- Suborder: Polyphaga
- Infraorder: Cucujiformia
- Family: Cerambycidae
- Genus: Leptura
- Species: L. aurulenta

Binomial name
- Leptura aurulenta Fabricius, 1792

= Leptura aurulenta =

Species of beetle

Leptura aurulenta is a species of beetle in the family Cerambycidae. It was described by Johan Christian Fabricius in 1792. It is distributed in Europe (widespread but absent from the north), North Africa (Algeria, Tunisia), and western Asia (Turkey).

Leptura aurulenta measure 12–25 mm (0.47–0.98 in).
