= Callidium brevicorne =

Scientific classification
- Kingdom: Animalia
- Phylum: Arthropoda
- Clade: Pancrustacea
- Class: Insecta
- Order: Coleoptera
- Suborder: Polyphaga
- Infraorder: Cucujiformia
- Family: Cerambycidae
- Genus: Callidium
- Species: C. brevicorne

Binomial name
- Callidium brevicorne Olivier, 1790

Species of beetle

Callidium brevicorne is a species of beetle in the family Cerambycidae. It was described by Oliver in 1790.
