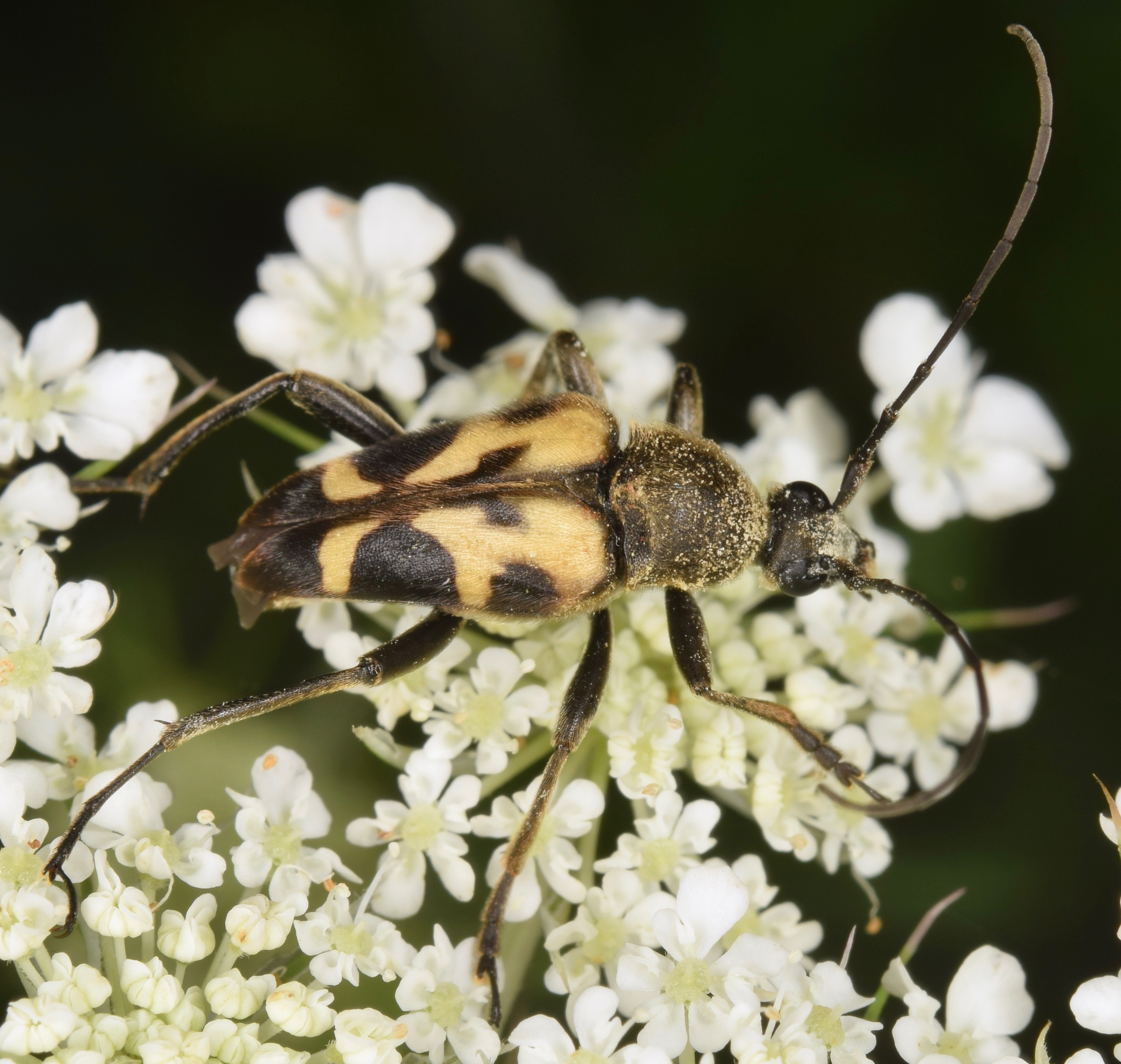

Scientific classification
- Kingdom: Animalia
- Phylum: Arthropoda
- Clade: Pancrustacea
- Class: Insecta
- Order: Coleoptera
- Suborder: Polyphaga
- Infraorder: Cucujiformia
- Family: Cerambycidae
- Genus: Judolia
- Species: J. cordifera

Binomial name
- Judolia cordifera (Olivier, 1795)

= Judolia cordifera =

Species of beetle

Judolia cordifera is a species of beetle in the family Cerambycidae. It was described by Guillaume-Antoine Olivier in 1795.
