= Callidium vandykei =

Scientific classification
- Domain: Eukaryota
- Kingdom: Animalia
- Phylum: Arthropoda
- Class: Insecta
- Order: Coleoptera
- Suborder: Polyphaga
- Infraorder: Cucujiformia
- Family: Cerambycidae
- Genus: Callidium
- Species: C. vandykei

Binomial name
- Callidium vandykei Linsley, 1957

Species of beetle

Callidium vandykei is a species of beetle in the family Cerambycidae. It was described by Linsley in 1957.
