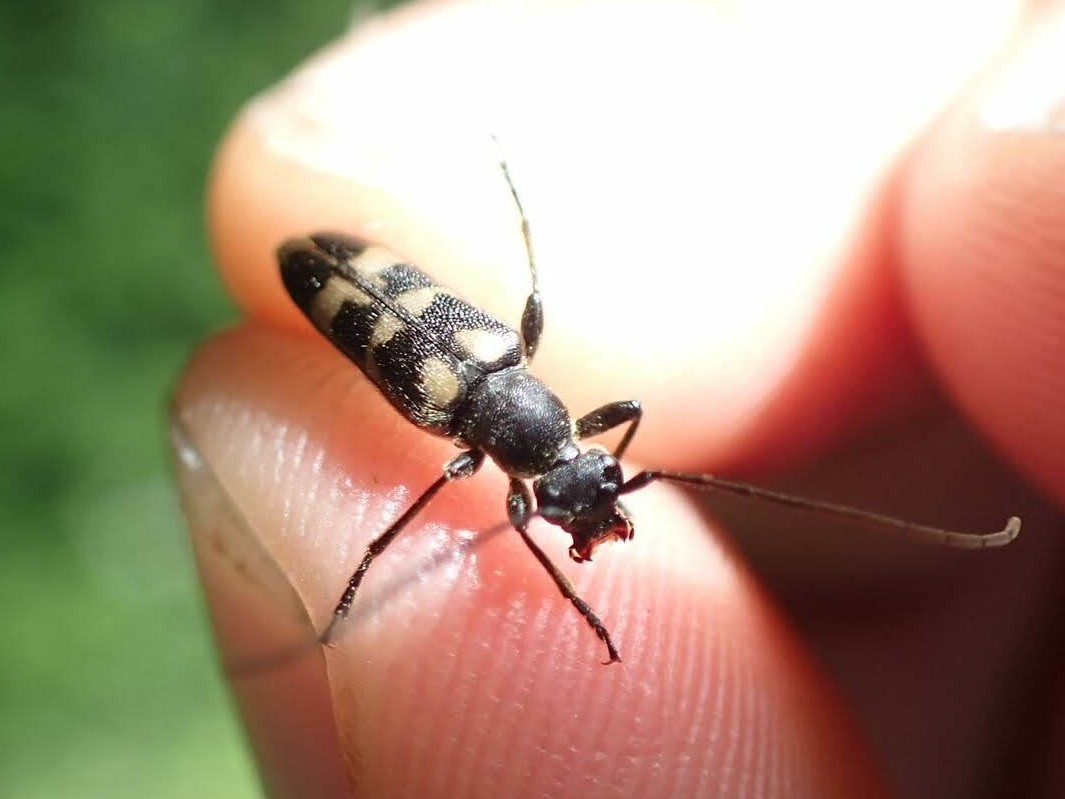

Scientific classification
- Domain: Eukaryota
- Kingdom: Animalia
- Phylum: Arthropoda
- Class: Insecta
- Order: Coleoptera
- Suborder: Polyphaga
- Infraorder: Cucujiformia
- Family: Cerambycidae
- Genus: Judolia
- Species: J. japonica

Binomial name
- Judolia japonica (Tamanuki, 1942)

= Judolia japonica =

Species of beetle

Judolia japonica is a species of beetle in the family Cerambycidae. It was described by Tamanuki in 1942.
