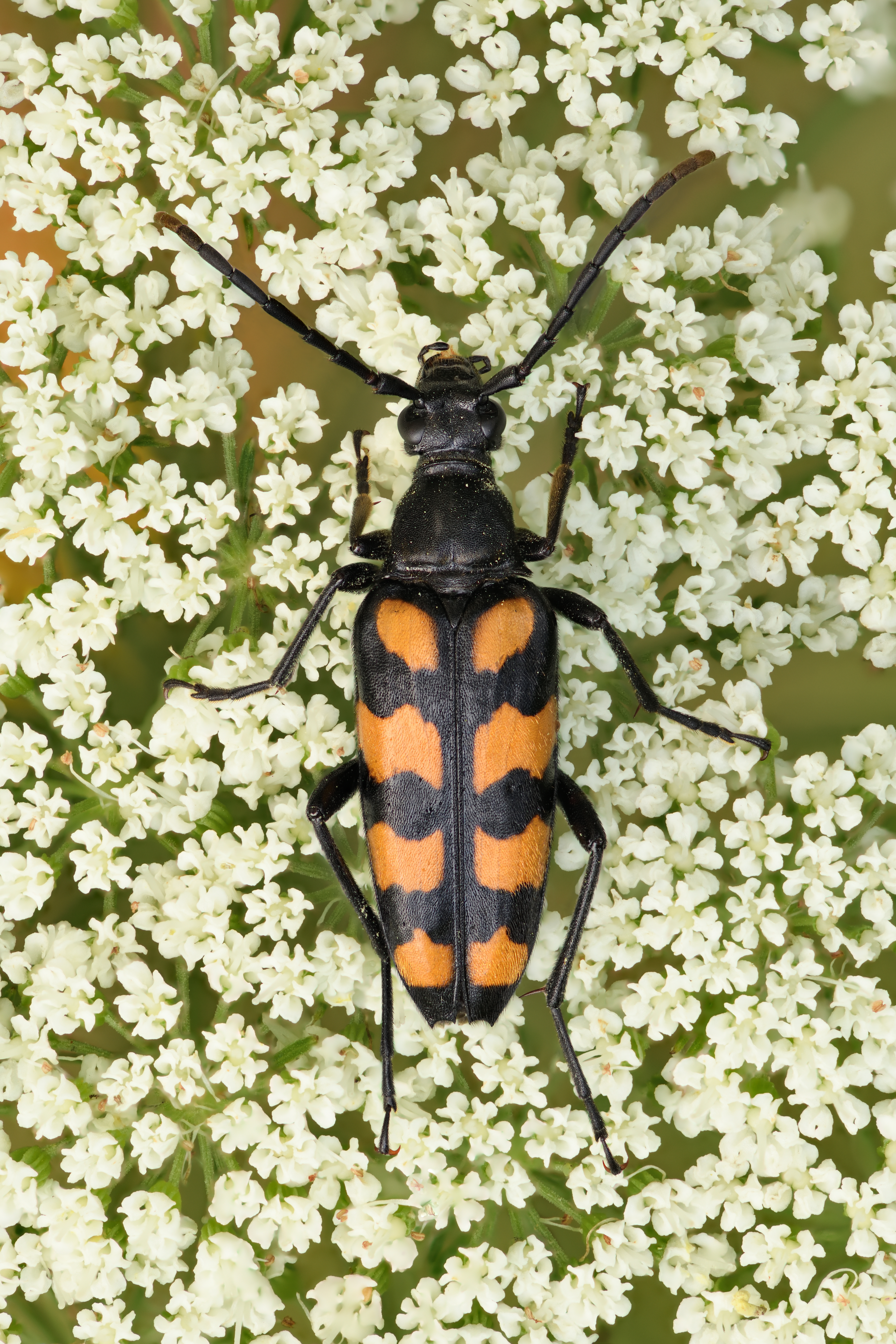
- Female

Scientific classification
- Kingdom: Animalia
- Phylum: Arthropoda
- Class: Insecta
- Order: Coleoptera
- Suborder: Polyphaga
- Infraorder: Cucujiformia
- Family: Cerambycidae
- Genus: Leptura
- Species: L. quadrifasciata

Binomial name
- Leptura quadrifasciata Linnaeus, 1758

Synonyms
- Strangalia quadrifasciata

= Leptura quadrifasciata =

Species of beetle

Leptura quadrifasciata, the four-banded longhorn beetle, is a species of beetle in the family Cerambycidae. It was described by Carl Linnaeus in his landmark 1758 10th edition of Systema Naturae.

Adult beetles are 11–20 mm long, black with four more or less continuous transverse yellow bands. In extreme cases the elytra may be almost entirely black. It is found throughout the northern and central Palearctic realm. The species is distributed in northern and central regions of Europe and Asia. It is particularly common in Scandinavia, Finland and Great Britain and is typically seen during the summer months. Larvae make meandering galleries in various trees, including oak, beech, birch, willow, alder, elder and spruce; typically in dead and decaying trees, with a preference for damp areas. The life cycle lasts two to three years.
