= Judolia antecurrens =

Scientific classification
- Domain: Eukaryota
- Kingdom: Animalia
- Phylum: Arthropoda
- Class: Insecta
- Order: Coleoptera
- Suborder: Polyphaga
- Infraorder: Cucujiformia
- Family: Cerambycidae
- Genus: Judolia
- Species: J. antecurrens

Binomial name
- Judolia antecurrens (Wickham, 1913)†

Species of beetle

Judolia antecurrens is an extinct species of beetle in the family Cerambycidae. It was described by Wickham in 1913.
