= Callidium schotti =

Scientific classification
- Domain: Eukaryota
- Kingdom: Animalia
- Phylum: Arthropoda
- Class: Insecta
- Order: Coleoptera
- Suborder: Polyphaga
- Infraorder: Cucujiformia
- Family: Cerambycidae
- Genus: Callidium
- Species: C. schotti

Binomial name
- Callidium schotti Schaeffer, 1917

Species of beetle

Callidium schotti is a species of beetle in the family Cerambycidae. It was described by Schaeffer in 1917.
