= Pidonia gnathoides =

Scientific classification
- Domain: Eukaryota
- Kingdom: Animalia
- Phylum: Arthropoda
- Class: Insecta
- Order: Coleoptera
- Suborder: Polyphaga
- Infraorder: Cucujiformia
- Family: Cerambycidae
- Genus: Pidonia
- Species: P. gnathoides

Binomial name
- Pidonia gnathoides (LeConte, 1873)

Species of beetle

Pidonia gnathoides is a species of beetle in the family Cerambycidae. It was described by John Lawrence LeConte in 1873.
