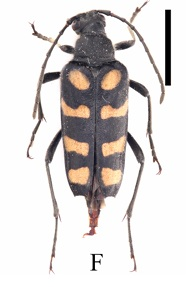

Scientific classification
- Domain: Eukaryota
- Kingdom: Animalia
- Phylum: Arthropoda
- Class: Insecta
- Order: Coleoptera
- Suborder: Polyphaga
- Infraorder: Cucujiformia
- Family: Cerambycidae
- Genus: Leptura
- Species: L. barkamica

Binomial name
- Leptura barkamica Holzschuh, 1998

= Leptura barkamica =

Species of beetle

Leptura barkamica is a species of beetle of the Cerambycidae family. This species is found in China (Sichuan, Yunnan, Xizang).
