= Callidium cicatricosum =

Scientific classification
- Domain: Eukaryota
- Kingdom: Animalia
- Phylum: Arthropoda
- Class: Insecta
- Order: Coleoptera
- Suborder: Polyphaga
- Infraorder: Cucujiformia
- Family: Cerambycidae
- Genus: Callidium
- Species: C. cicatricosum

Binomial name
- Callidium cicatricosum Mannerheim, 1853

Species of beetle

Callidium cicatricosum is a species of beetle, also referred to as the long-horned beetle, in the family Cerambycidae. It was described by Mannerheim in 1853.
