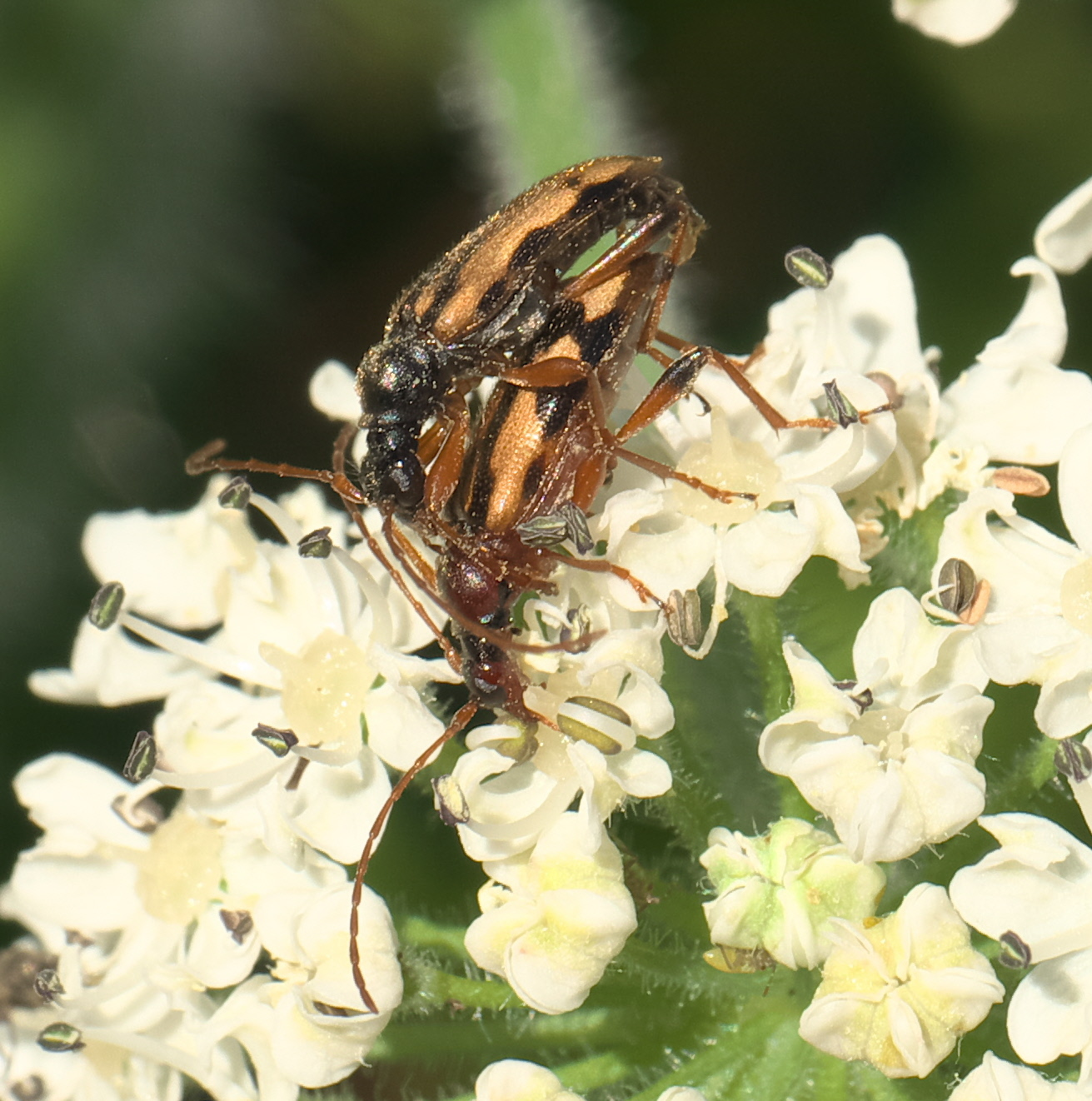

Scientific classification
- Domain: Eukaryota
- Kingdom: Animalia
- Phylum: Arthropoda
- Class: Insecta
- Order: Coleoptera
- Suborder: Polyphaga
- Infraorder: Cucujiformia
- Family: Cerambycidae
- Genus: Pidonia
- Species: P. scripta

Binomial name
- Pidonia scripta Chemsak, 2005

= Pidonia scripta =

Species of beetle

Pidonia scripta is a species of beetle in the family Cerambycidae.
