= Judolia gaurotoides =

Scientific classification
- Kingdom: Animalia
- Phylum: Arthropoda
- Class: Insecta
- Order: Coleoptera
- Suborder: Polyphaga
- Infraorder: Cucujiformia
- Family: Cerambycidae
- Genus: Judolia
- Species: J. gaurotoides

Binomial name
- Judolia gaurotoides (Casey, 1893)

Species of beetle

Judolia gaurotoides is a species of beetle in the family Cerambycidae. It was described by Casey in 1893.
