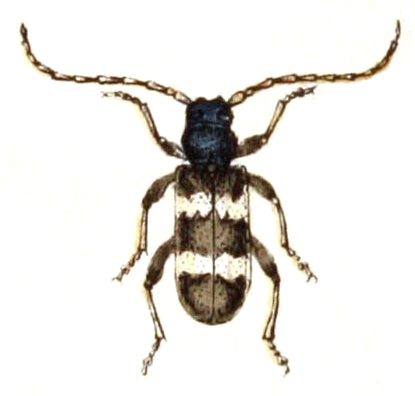
- Callidium undatum

Scientific classification
- Domain: Eukaryota
- Kingdom: Animalia
- Phylum: Arthropoda
- Class: Insecta
- Order: Coleoptera
- Suborder: Polyphaga
- Infraorder: Cucujiformia
- Family: Cerambycidae
- Subfamily: Cerambycinae
- Tribe: Callidiini
- Genus: Callidium; Fabricius, 1775

= Callidium =

Callidium Temporal range: Eocene – Pliocene 37.2–Recent Ma

Genus of beetles

Callidium is a genus of beetles in the family Cerambycidae, containing the following species:

- Callidium angustipennis Chemsak, 1964
- Callidium antennatum Newman, 1838
- Callidium bifasciatum Fabricius, 1787
- Callidium biguttatum Sallé, 1856
- Callidium brevicorne Olivier, 1790
- Callidium californicum Casey, 1912
- Callidium cicatricosum Mannerheim, 1853
- Callidium duodecimsignatum Perroud, 1855
- Callidium flavosignatum (Pu, 1991)
- Callidium frigidum Casey, 1912
- Callidium fulvicolle Fabricius, 1792
- Callidium hoppingi Linsley, 1957
- Callidium juniperi Fisher, 1920
- Callidium leechi Linsley & Chemsak, 1963
- Callidium powelli Linsley & Chemsak, 1963
- Callidium pseudotsugae Fisher, 1920
- Callidium rufipenne Motschulsky, 1860
- Callidium schotti Schaeffer, 1917
- Callidium sempervirens Linsley, 1942
- Callidium sequoiarium Fisher, 1920
- Callidium texanum Schaeffer, 1917
- Callidium vandykei Linsley, 1957
- Callidium violaceipenne Linsley & Chemsak, 1963
- Callidium violaceum (Linnaeus, 1758)
- Callidium viridocyaneum Linsley & Chemsak, 1963

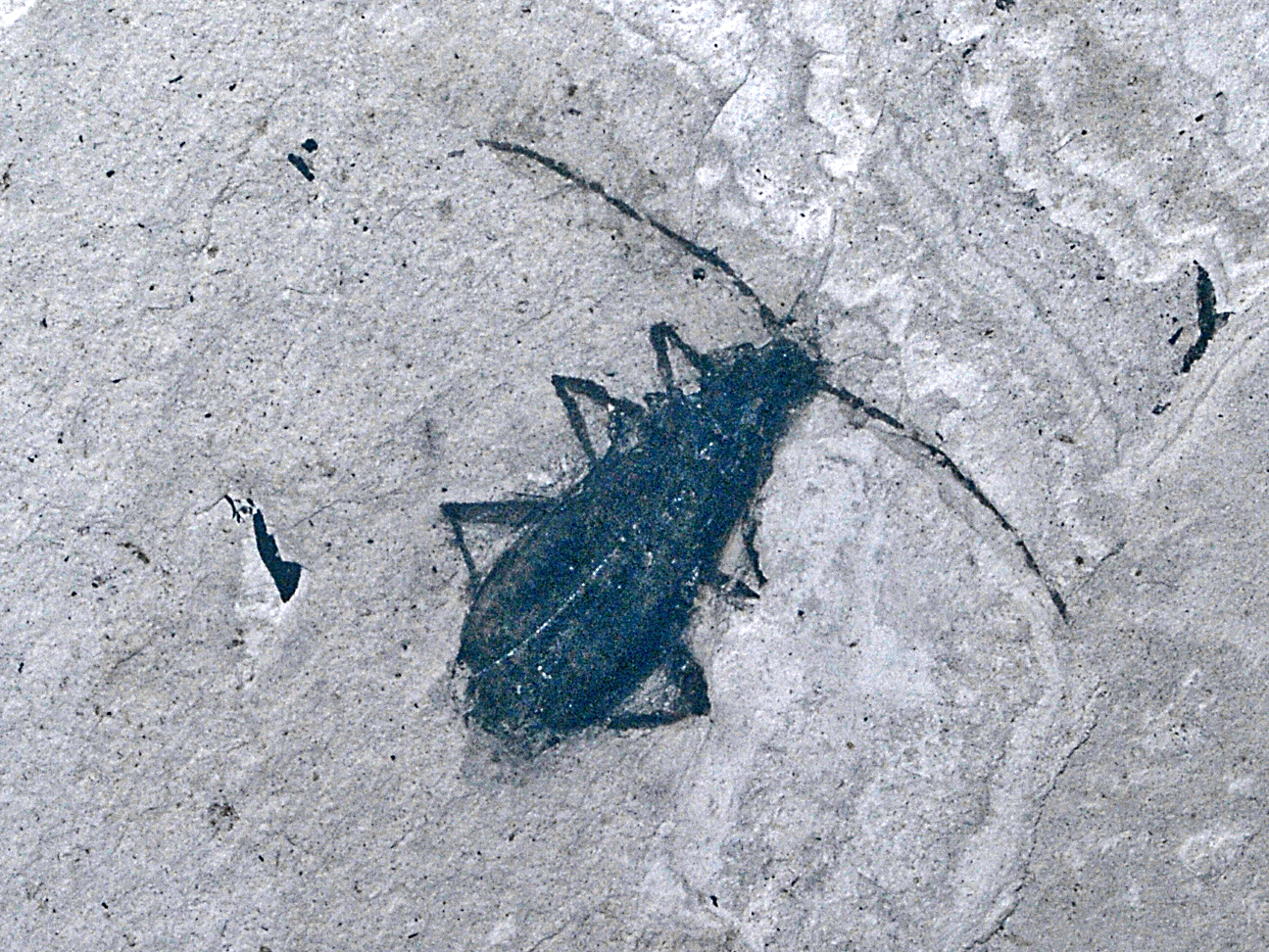
Fossil of Callidium species

== Fossil record ==
This genus is known in the fossil record from the Eocene to the Pliocene (from about 37.2 to Recent). Fossils of species within this genus have been found in Poland, Germany, and France.
