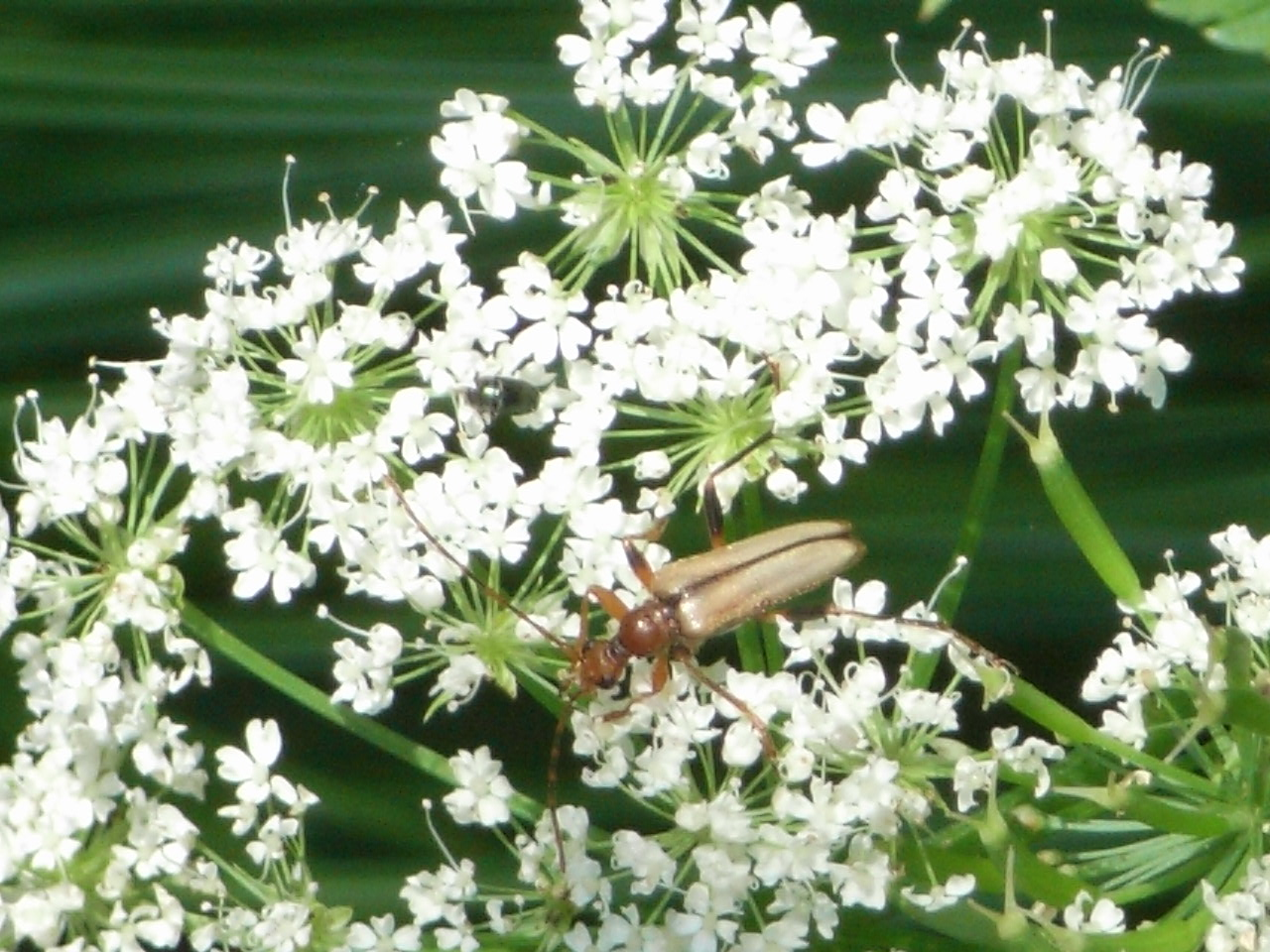
- Pidonia lurida

Scientific classification
- Kingdom: Animalia
- Phylum: Arthropoda
- Class: Insecta
- Order: Coleoptera
- Suborder: Polyphaga
- Infraorder: Cucujiformia
- Family: Cerambycidae
- Tribe: Rhagiini
- Genus: Pidonia; Mulsant, 1863

= Pidonia =

Genus of beetles

Pidonia is a genus of beetles in the family Cerambycidae, containing the following species:

- Pidonia aenipennis (Gressitt, 1935)
- Pidonia aegrota (Bates, 1884)
- Pidonia aestivalis Kuboki, 1994
- Pidonia albomaculata (Matsushita, 1931)
- Pidonia alpina An & Kwon, 1991
- Pidonia alsophila Kuboki, 1977
- Pidonia alticollis (Kraatz, 1879)
- Pidonia amabilis Kuboki, 1980
- Pidonia amentata (Bates, 1884)
- Pidonia amurensis Pic, 1900
- Pidonia angustata Kuboki, 1994
- Pidonia anmashana Kuboki, 1993
- Pidonia approximata Kuboki, 1977
- Pidonia armata Holzschuh, 1991
- Pidonia atripennis Hayashi, 1978
- Pidonia atritarsis Holzschuh, 2013
- Pidonia aurata (Horn, 1860)
- Pidonia balteata Holzschuh, 2013
- Pidonia benesi Holzschuh, 1998
- Pidonia binigrosignata Hayashi, 1974
- Pidonia bispina Holzschuh, 1998
- Pidonia bivittata Saito, 1980
- Pidonia bouvieri Pic, 1901
- Pidonia businskyorum Holzschuh, 1998
- Pidonia chairo Tamanuki, 1942
- Pidonia changi Hayashi, 1971
- Pidonia chiaomui Kuboki, 1995
- Pidonia chienhsingi Kuboki, 1995
- Pidonia chinensis Hayashi & Villiers, 1985
- Pidonia confusa Saito, 1980
- Pidonia chui Chou, 1998
- Pidonia chujoi Ohbayashi & Hayashi, 1960
- Pidonia compta Holzschuh, 1998
- Pidonia cuprescens Holzschuh, 1991
- Pidonia dealbata Kuboki, 1981
- Pidonia debilis (Kraatz, 1879)
- Pidonia densicollis (Casey, 1914)
- Pidonia dentipes Holzschuh, 1998
- Pidonia deodara Kuboki, 1986
- Pidonia determinata Holzschuh 1998
- Pidonia discoidalis Pic, 1901
- Pidonia diversenotata (Pic, 1956)
- Pidonia effracta Holzschuh, 1998
- Pidonia elegans An & Kwon, 1991
- Pidonia erlangshana Holzschuh, 2013
- Pidonia exilis Holzschuh, 1991
- Pidonia falcata Kuboki 1997
- Pidonia flaccidissima Kuboki, 1994
- Pidonia formosana Tamanuki & Mitono, 1939
- Pidonia formosissima Kuboki 1980 Kuboki, 1980
- Pidonia foveolata Holzschuh, 1998
- Pidonia frivola Holzschuh, 1998
- Pidonia fujisana Obika & Kusama, 1971
- Pidonia fumaria Holzschuh, 2003
- Pidonia fushani Kuboki, 1993
- Pidonia gibbicollis Blessig, 1873
- Pidonia gloriosa Kuboki, 1993
- Pidonia gnathoides (LeConte, 1873)
- Pidonia gorodinskii Holzschuh 1998
- Pidonia grallatrix (Bates, 1884)
- Pidonia hamadryas Kuboki, 1977
- Pidonia hamifera Holzschuh, 1998
- Pidonia hayakawai Kuboki, 2001
- Pidonia hayashii Koike, 1971
- Pidonia heudei (Gressitt, 1939)
- Pidonia himehana Saito, 1992
- Pidonia hohuanshana Chou, 1998
- Pidonia hylophila Kuboki, 1977
- Pidonia ignobilis Holzschuh, 1991
- Pidonia indigna Holzschuh, 1991
- Pidonia infuscata (Gressitt, 1939)
- Pidonia insperata A. Saito, 1995
- Pidonia insuturata Pic, 1901
- Pidonia jasha Saito & Saito, 1989
- Pidonia kanwonensis Danilevsky, 1993
- Pidonia kurosawai Ohbayashi & Hayashi, 1966
- Pidonia kyushuensis Yamawaki, 1959
- Pidonia leucanthophila Kuboki, 1978
- Pidonia limbaticollis (Pic, 1902)
- Pidonia longipalpis Kuboki, 1985
- Pidonia longipennis An & Kwon, 1991
- Pidonia lucida Holzschuh, 1991
- Pidonia ludmilae Holzschuh, 1998
- Pidonia luna Chou & Wu, 2005
- Pidonia lurida (Fabricius, 1792)
- Pidonia luridaria Holzschuh, 1998
- Pidonia lyra Kuboki & Suzuki, 1978
- Pidonia maai Gressitt, 1951
- Pidonia maculithorax Pic, 1901
- Pidonia major Saito, 1979
- Pidonia malthinoides (Kraatz, 1879)
- Pidonia maoxiana Holzschuh, 2013
- Pidonia masakii Hayashi, 1955
- Pidonia matsushitai Ohbayashi, 1958
- Pidonia maura Danilevsky, 1996
- Pidonia meridionalis Kuboki, 1978
- Pidonia michinokuensis Hayashi, 1981
- Pidonia mimica Holzschuh, 2017
- Pidonia misenina Saito & Saito, 1992
- Pidonia mitis Holzschuh, 1992
- Pidonia miwai Matsushita, 1933
- Pidonia moderata Holzschuh 2017
- Pidonia modesta Kuboki, 1997
- Pidonia morikawai Kuboki, 2001
- Pidonia murzini Holzschuh, 2013
- Pidonia mutata (Bates, 1884)
- Pidonia nakabayashii Kuboki, 2014
- Pidonia neglecta Kuboki, 1982
- Pidonia nitidicollis (Horn, 1860)
- Pidonia nobuoi Chou, 2009
- Pidonia obfuscata Holzschuh, 1991
- Pidonia obscurior Pic, 1901
- Pidonia occipitalis Gressitt, 1935
- Pidonia ogasawarai Kuboki, 2015
- Pidonia ohminesana Mizuno 1987
- Pidonia orientalis Matsushita, 1933
- Pidonia orophila Holzschuh, 1991
- Pidonia oyamae Oyama, 1908
- Pidonia palleola Holzschuh, 1991
- Pidonia pallida Ohbayashi & Hayashi, 1960
- Pidonia pallidicolor Hayashi, 1983
- Pidonia palligera Holzschuh, 1995
- Pidonia palposa Holzschuh, 2017
- Pidonia paradisiacola Kuboki, 1977
- Pidonia pauperula Holzschuh, 1999
- Pidonia picta Ganglbauer, 1889
- Pidonia pilushana Saito, 1979
- Pidonia propinqua Danilevsky, 1993
- Pidonia pudica Kuboki, 1994
- Pidonia pullata Holzschuh, 1998
- Pidonia puziloi (Solsky, 1873)
- Pidonia qinlingana Holzschuh, 1998
- Pidonia quadrata (Hopping, 1931)
- Pidonia ruficollis (Say, 1824)
- Pidonia rutila Holzschuh, 1998
- Pidonia sacrosancta Kuboki, 1995
- Pidonia sakimori Kuboki 2015
- Pidonia satoi A. Saito & S. Saito, 2003
- Pidonia sciaphila Kuboki, 2001
- Pidonia scripta (LeConte, 1869)
- Pidonia semiobscura Pic, 1901
- Pidonia seorsa Holzschuh, 1991
- Pidonia sertata Holzschuh, 1998
- Pidonia seungmoi An & Kwon, 1991
- Pidonia shikokensis Chujo & Hayashi, 1951
- Pidonia sichuanica Holzschuh, 1992
- Pidonia signata Matsushita, 1933
- Pidonia signifera (Bates, 1884)
- Pidonia similis (Kraatz, 1879)
- Pidonia simillima Ohbayashi & Hayashi, 1960
- Pidonia sororia Holzschuh, 1992
- Pidonia straminea Holzschuh, 1992
- Pidonia striolata Holzschuh, 2013
- Pidonia subaenea Gressitt, 1935
- Pidonia submetallica Hayashi, 1974
- Pidonia subsuturalis Plavilstshikov, 1915
- Pidonia suvorovi Baeckmann, 1903
- Pidonia suzukii Kuboki, 1983
- Pidonia sylvicola Kuboki, 1977
- Pidonia taipingshana Kuboki, 1995
- Pidonia takahashii Kuboki, 1983
- Pidonia takakuwai Chou, 2009
- Pidonia takechii Kuboki, 1986
- Pidonia testacea (Matsushita, 1933)
- Pidonia tsukamotoi Mizuno, 1978
- Pidonia tsushimana Saito & Saito, 1988
- Pidonia tsutsuii Kuboki, 1996
- Pidonia tsuyukii Kuboki, 1994
- Pidonia vibex (Newman, 1841)
- Pidonia warusawadakensis Ohbayashi, 1959
- Pidonia weigeli Vives, 2016
- Pidonia weolseonae An & Kwon, 1991
- Pidonia yamato Hayashi & Mizuno, 1953
- Pidonia yushana Chou & Wu, 2005
