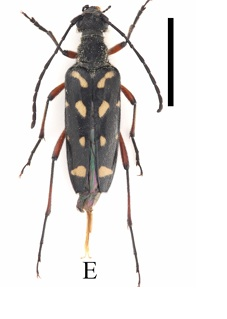

Scientific classification
- Kingdom: Animalia
- Phylum: Arthropoda
- Class: Insecta
- Order: Coleoptera
- Suborder: Polyphaga
- Infraorder: Cucujiformia
- Family: Cerambycidae
- Genus: Leptura
- Species: L. rufoannulata

Binomial name
- Leptura rufoannulata (Pic, 1933)

Synonyms
- Strangalia 12-guttata v. rufoannulata Pic, 1933; Strangalia rufoannulata a. jurečeki Heyrovský, 1934; Leptura fisheriana Gressitt, 1938

= Leptura rufoannulata =

Species of beetle

Leptura rufoannulata is a species of beetle of the Cerambycidae family. This species is found in China (Sichuan, Fujian, Hubei).
