= Pidonia ruficollis =

Scientific classification
- Domain: Eukaryota
- Kingdom: Animalia
- Phylum: Arthropoda
- Class: Insecta
- Order: Coleoptera
- Suborder: Polyphaga
- Infraorder: Cucujiformia
- Family: Cerambycidae
- Genus: Pidonia
- Species: P. ruficollis

Binomial name
- Pidonia ruficollis (Say, 1824)

Species of beetle

Pidonia ruficollis is a species of beetle in the family Cerambycidae. It was described by Say in 1824.
