= Phymatodes fulgidus =

Scientific classification
- Kingdom: Animalia
- Phylum: Arthropoda
- Clade: Pancrustacea
- Class: Insecta
- Order: Coleoptera
- Suborder: Polyphaga
- Infraorder: Cucujiformia
- Family: Cerambycidae
- Subfamily: Cerambycinae
- Tribe: Callidiini
- Genus: Phymatodes
- Species: P. fulgidus

Binomial name
- Phymatodes fulgidus Hopping, 1928

Species of beetle

Phymatodes fulgidus is a species of longhorn beetle in the family Cerambycidae. It is found in North America.
