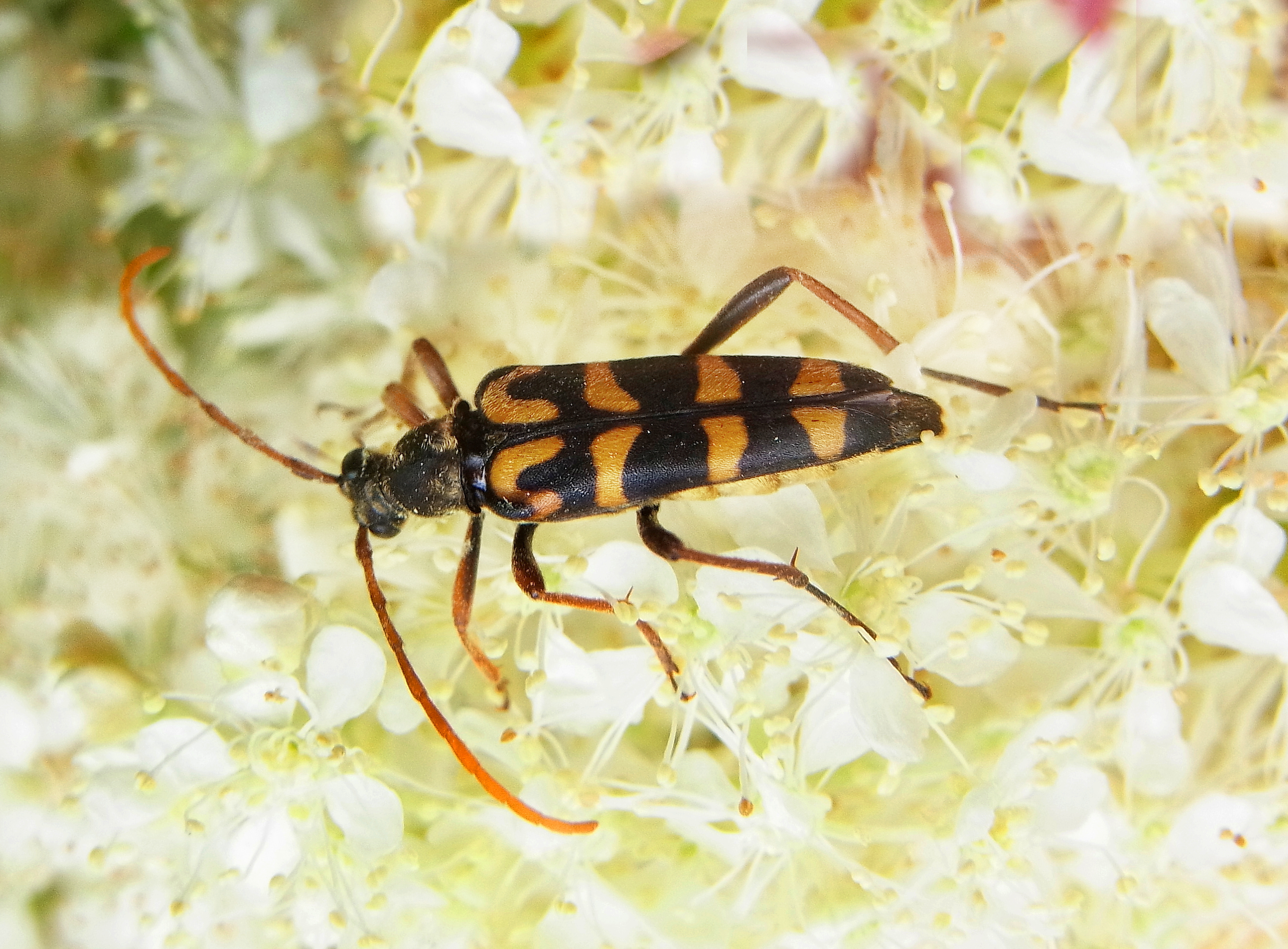

Scientific classification
- Kingdom: Animalia
- Phylum: Arthropoda
- Class: Insecta
- Order: Coleoptera
- Suborder: Polyphaga
- Infraorder: Cucujiformia
- Family: Cerambycidae
- Genus: Leptura
- Species: L. annularis

Binomial name
- Leptura annularis Fabricius, 1801

= Leptura annularis =

Species of beetle

Leptura annularis is a species of beetle in the family Cerambycidae. It was described by Johan Christian Fabricius in 1801.
