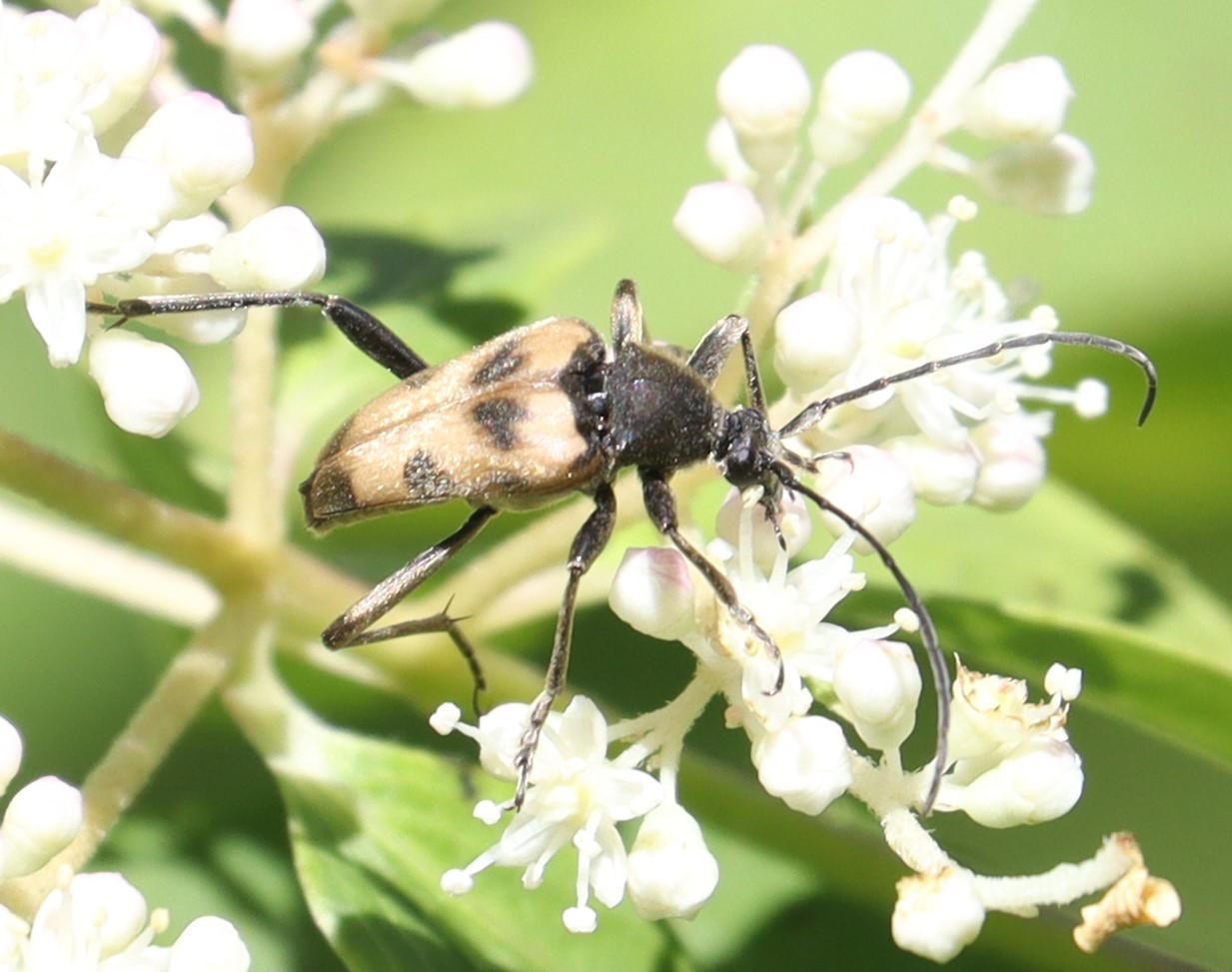

Scientific classification
- Domain: Eukaryota
- Kingdom: Animalia
- Phylum: Arthropoda
- Class: Insecta
- Order: Coleoptera
- Suborder: Polyphaga
- Infraorder: Cucujiformia
- Family: Cerambycidae
- Genus: Judolia
- Species: J. cometes

Binomial name
- Judolia cometes (Bates, 1884)

= Judolia cometes =

Species of beetle

Judolia cometes is a species of beetle in the family Cerambycidae. It was described by Henry Walter Bates in 1884.
