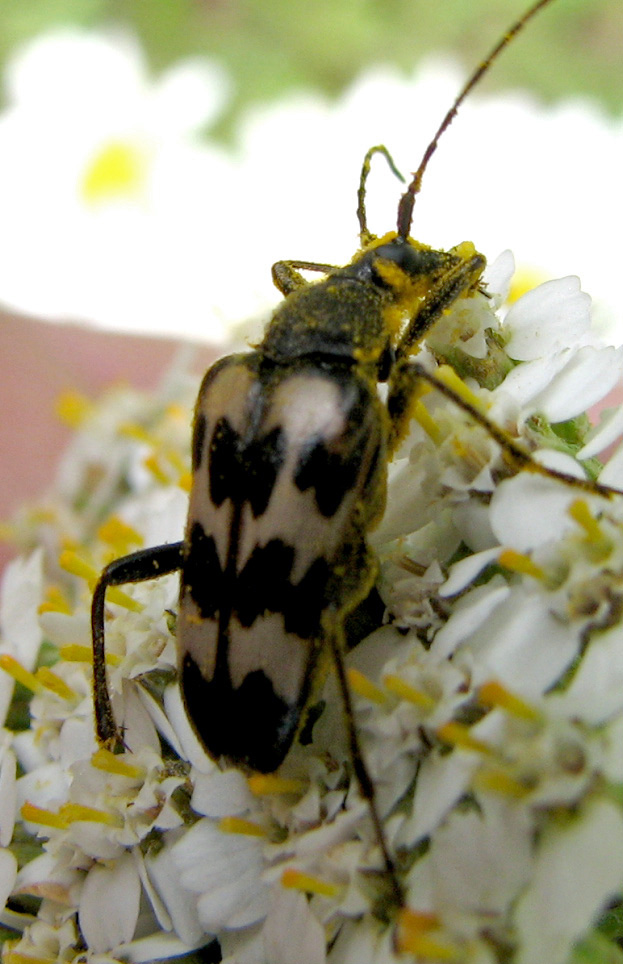

Scientific classification
- Domain: Eukaryota
- Kingdom: Animalia
- Phylum: Arthropoda
- Class: Insecta
- Order: Coleoptera
- Suborder: Polyphaga
- Infraorder: Cucujiformia
- Family: Cerambycidae
- Genus: Judolia
- Species: J. montivagans

Binomial name
- Judolia montivagans (Couper, 1864)

= Judolia montivagans =

Species of beetle

Judolia montivagans is a species of beetle in the family Cerambycidae. It was described by Couper in 1864.
