= Ortholeptura obscura =

Scientific classification
- Domain: Eukaryota
- Kingdom: Animalia
- Phylum: Arthropoda
- Class: Insecta
- Order: Coleoptera
- Suborder: Polyphaga
- Infraorder: Cucujiformia
- Family: Cerambycidae
- Genus: Ortholeptura
- Species: O. obscura

Binomial name
- Ortholeptura obscura (Swaine & Hopping, 1928)

Species of beetle

Ortholeptura obscura is a species of flower longhorn in the beetle family Cerambycidae. It is found in North America.
