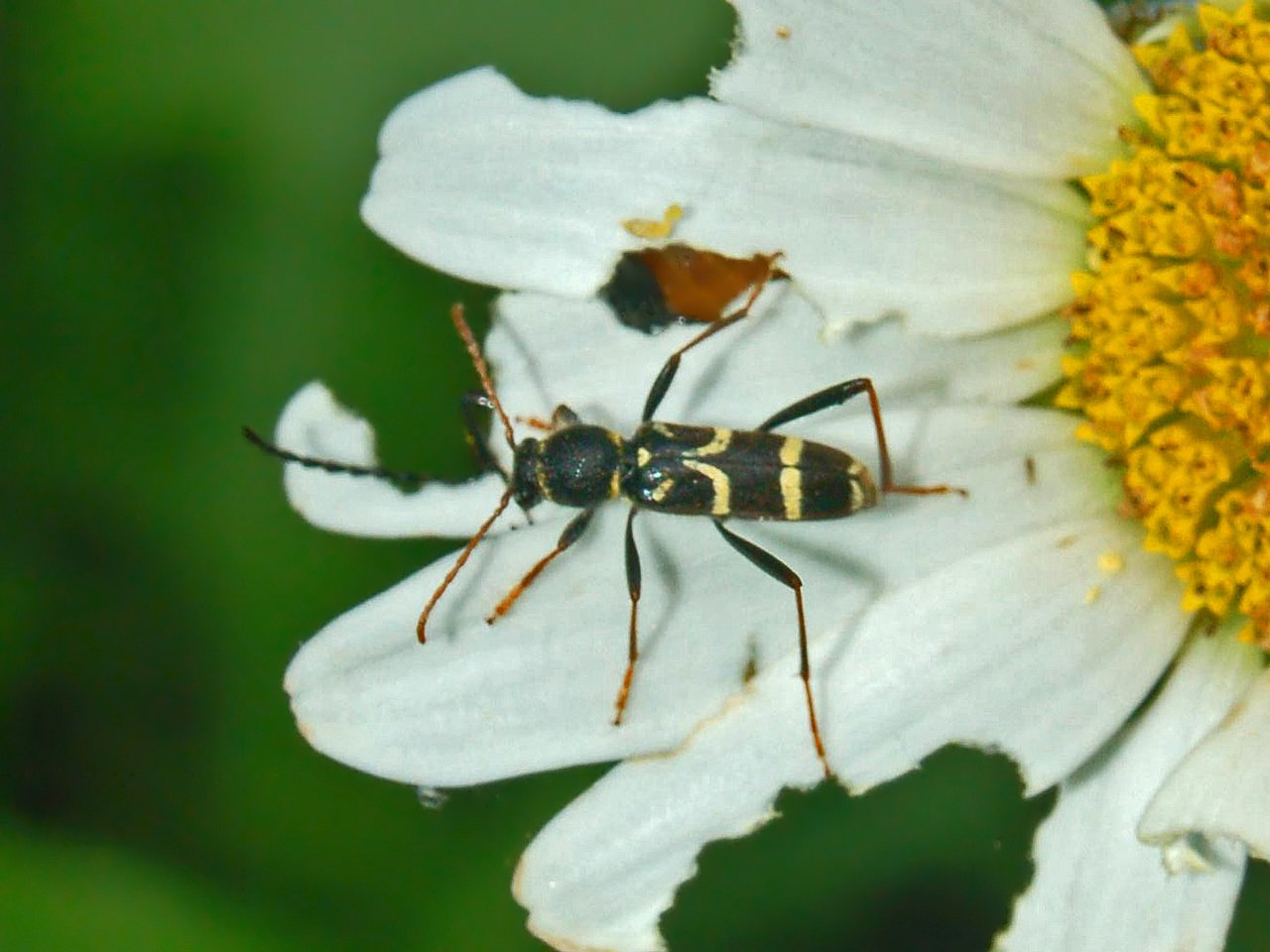
- Clytus rhamni bellieri

Scientific classification
- Domain: Eukaryota
- Kingdom: Animalia
- Phylum: Arthropoda
- Class: Insecta
- Order: Coleoptera
- Suborder: Polyphaga
- Infraorder: Cucujiformia
- Family: Cerambycidae
- Genus: Clytus
- Species: C. rhamni

Binomial name
- Clytus rhamni Germar, 1817

Synonyms
- Sphegesthes rhamni (Germar, 1817); Callidium temesiensis Germar, 1824; Clytus paliuri Depoli, 1940; Clytus rhamni Ilic & Curcic, 2013; Clytus rhamni subsp. rhamni Danilevsky, 2012; Clytus rhamni var. innormalis Pic, 1927

= Clytus rhamni =

Species of beetle

Clytus rhamni is a species of round-necked longhorn beetle belonging to the family Cerambycidae, subfamily Cerambycinae.

== Subspecies ==
Subspecies include:

- Clytus rhamni bellieri (Gautier, 1862)
- Clytus rhamni rhamni (Germar, 1817)
- Clytus rhamni temesiensis (Germar, 1824)

== Distribution ==
This common beetle is present in most of Europe (Albania, Austria, Belarus, Bosnia and Herzegovina, Bulgaria, Croatia, Czech Republic, France, Germany, Greece, Hungary, Italy, Republic of North Macedonia, Moldova, Montenegro, Portugal, Romania, Russia, Serbia, Slovakia, Spain, Switzerland, Ukraine) in the eastern Palearctic realm, Caucasus, North Kazakhstan, Transcaucasia, Turkey, Armenia, Israel, Syria, Iran, and in the Near East.

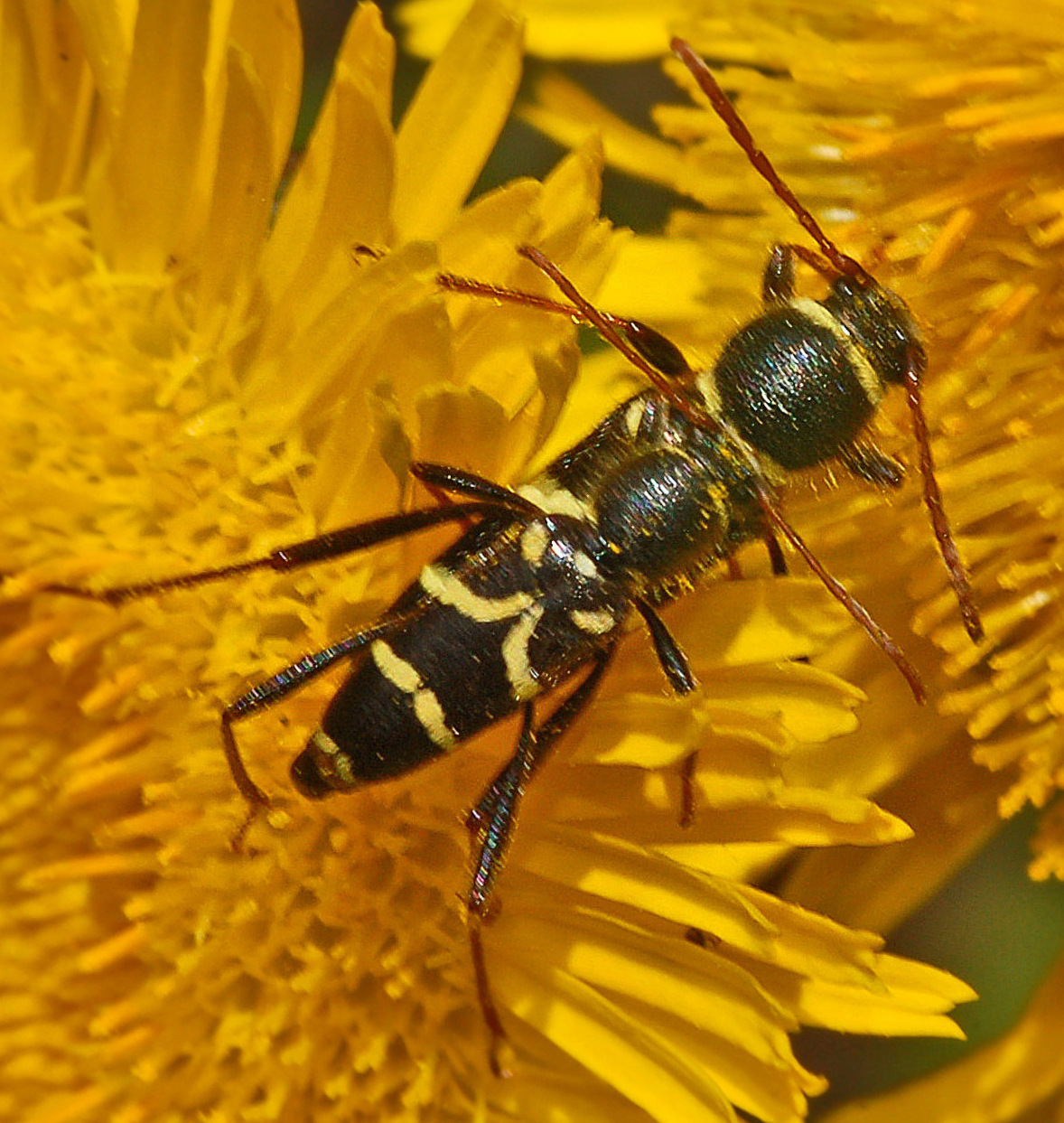
Clytus rhamni. Mating couple

== Habitat ==
This species occurs almost everywhere, but especially in meadows, in shrubs, in glades of wood, orchards and along paths.

== Description ==
Clytus rhamni can reach a body length of about 6–12 mm (0.24–0.47 in). Head, pronotum and elytra are brownish or black. Males show a pronotum relatively fine and simply dotted, while females are coarser dotted.

Elytra are only thinly dotted and more or less glossy. Antennae and legs are red-yellow, but the hind legs are darker. The elytrae are crossed by light yellow stripes, as this beetle imitates, for defensive purposes, like other species of the genus Clytus, the chromatic variety of wasps.

Bicolor tibiae distinguish Clytus rhamni bellieri subspecies. This species is very similar to Clytus arietis.

== Biology ==
Adults can be encountered from May through August, completing their life cycle in two year. These polyphagous beetles develop in dead wood of various deciduous trees. The imagos fly the second year. Larvae mainly feed in the dead wood of small branches of Rhamnus (hence the specific name), Castanea, Quercus, Ficus, Ulmus, Pyrus, Prunus species. The adults are very common flower-visitors.

== Bibliography ==
- C. Gautier des Cottes: Genre nouveau de Staphilinien et déscription de nouvelles espèces de coléoptères de Syrie et d'Europe in Annales de la Société entomologique de France 4. Serie, 2. Band, Paris 1862
- F. Picard: Faune de France - 20 - Coléoptères - Cerambycidae Paris 1929
- Mulsant: Tribu des Longicornes (suite) in Annales des sciences physiques et naturelles, d'agriculture et d'industrie Band VII Lyon, Paris 1863
- Hüseyin Özdikmen: Turkish Red List categories of Longicorn Beetles (Coleoptera: Cerambycidae) part VIII: subfamily Cerambycinae, Anaglyptini and Clytini. in Munis Entomology & Zoology Vol 9, No 2, June 2014: 687–712.
- Mulsant: Larves des coléoptères in Annales de la Société Linnéenne de Lyon Band 23 Lyon, Paris 1877
- Hüseyin Özdikmen, Mohammed Anwar Ali: Four genera and species new for the fauna of Iraque .... in Munis Entomology & Zoology Vol 12, No 2
