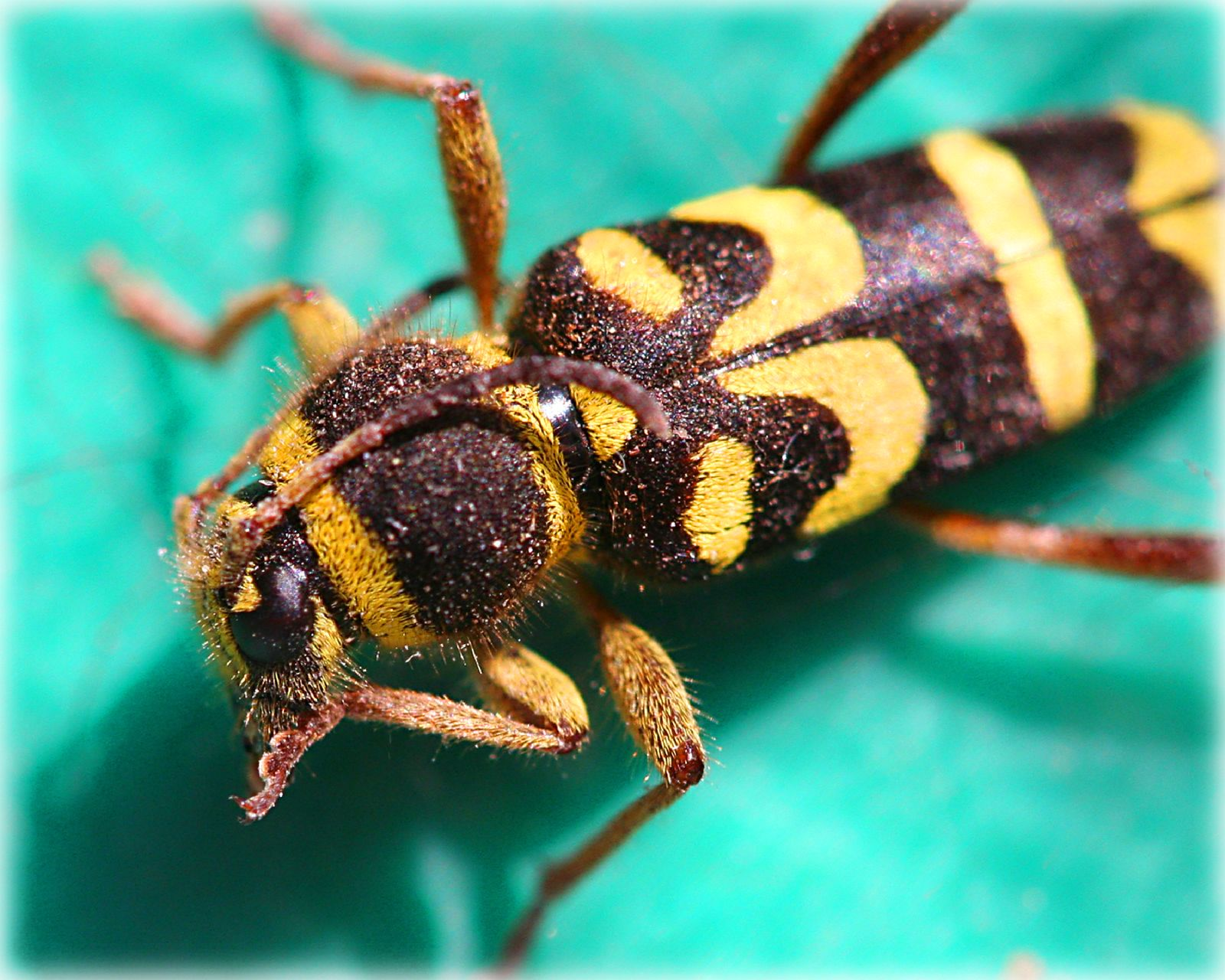

Scientific classification
- Domain: Eukaryota
- Kingdom: Animalia
- Phylum: Arthropoda
- Class: Insecta
- Order: Coleoptera
- Suborder: Polyphaga
- Infraorder: Cucujiformia
- Family: Cerambycidae
- Genus: Clytus
- Species: C. planifrons

Binomial name
- Clytus planifrons (LeConte, 1874)

= Clytus planifrons =

Species of beetle

Clytus planifrons is a species of long-horned beetle in the family Cerambycidae. It was described by John Lawrence LeConte in 1874 and occurs on the Pacific coast of North America.
