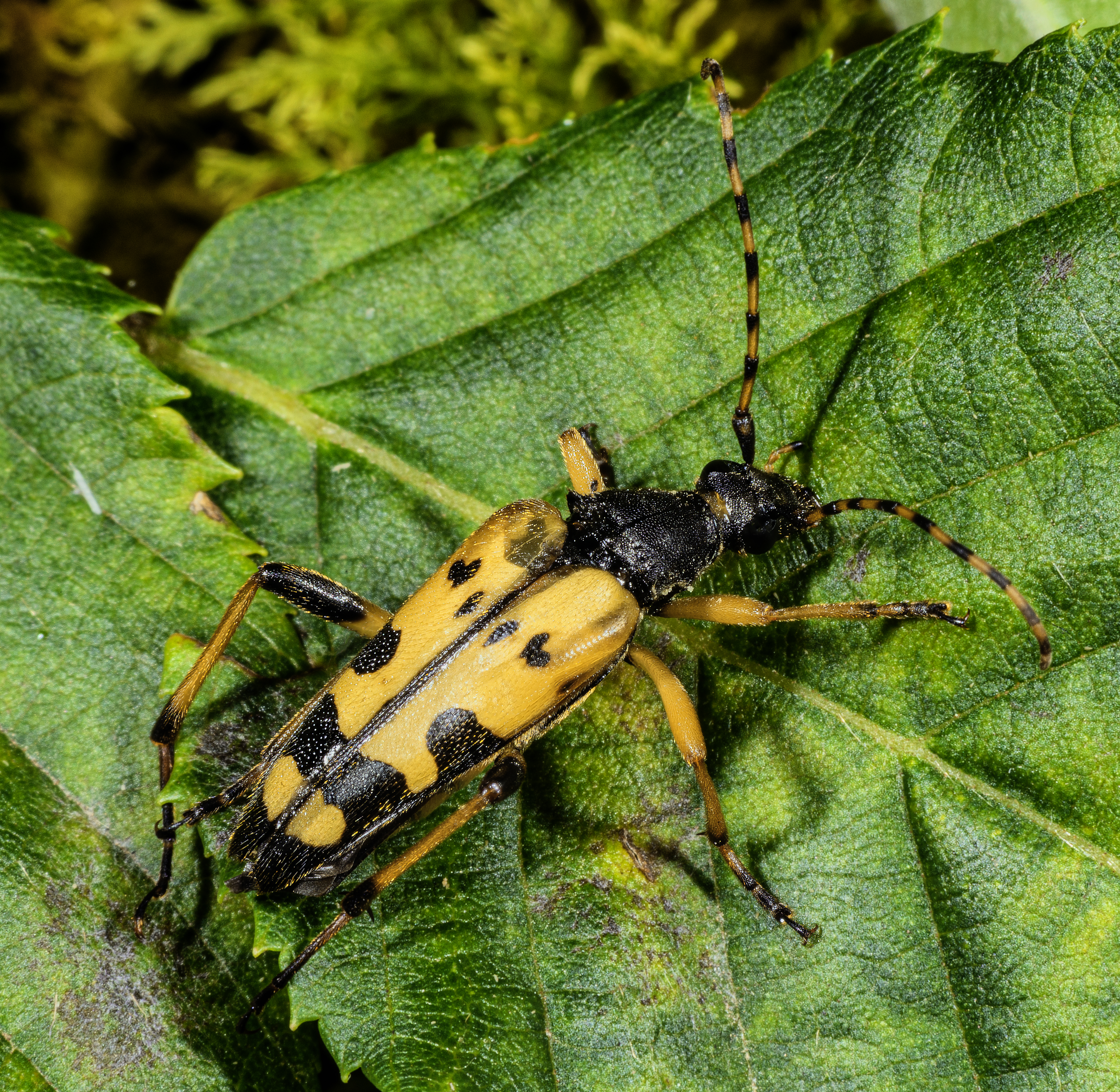
- Rutpela maculata

Scientific classification
- Kingdom: Animalia
- Phylum: Arthropoda
- Class: Insecta
- Order: Coleoptera
- Suborder: Polyphaga
- Infraorder: Cucujiformia
- Family: Cerambycidae
- Subfamily: Lepturinae
- Genus: Rutpela; Nakane & Ohbayashi, 1957

= Rutpela =

Genus of beetles

Rutpela is a genus of beetles belonging to the family Cerambycidae, subfamily Lepturinae.

== Species ==
Species within this genus include:

- Rutpela inermis (Daniel K. & Daniel J., 1898)
- Rutpela maculata (Poda, 1761)
