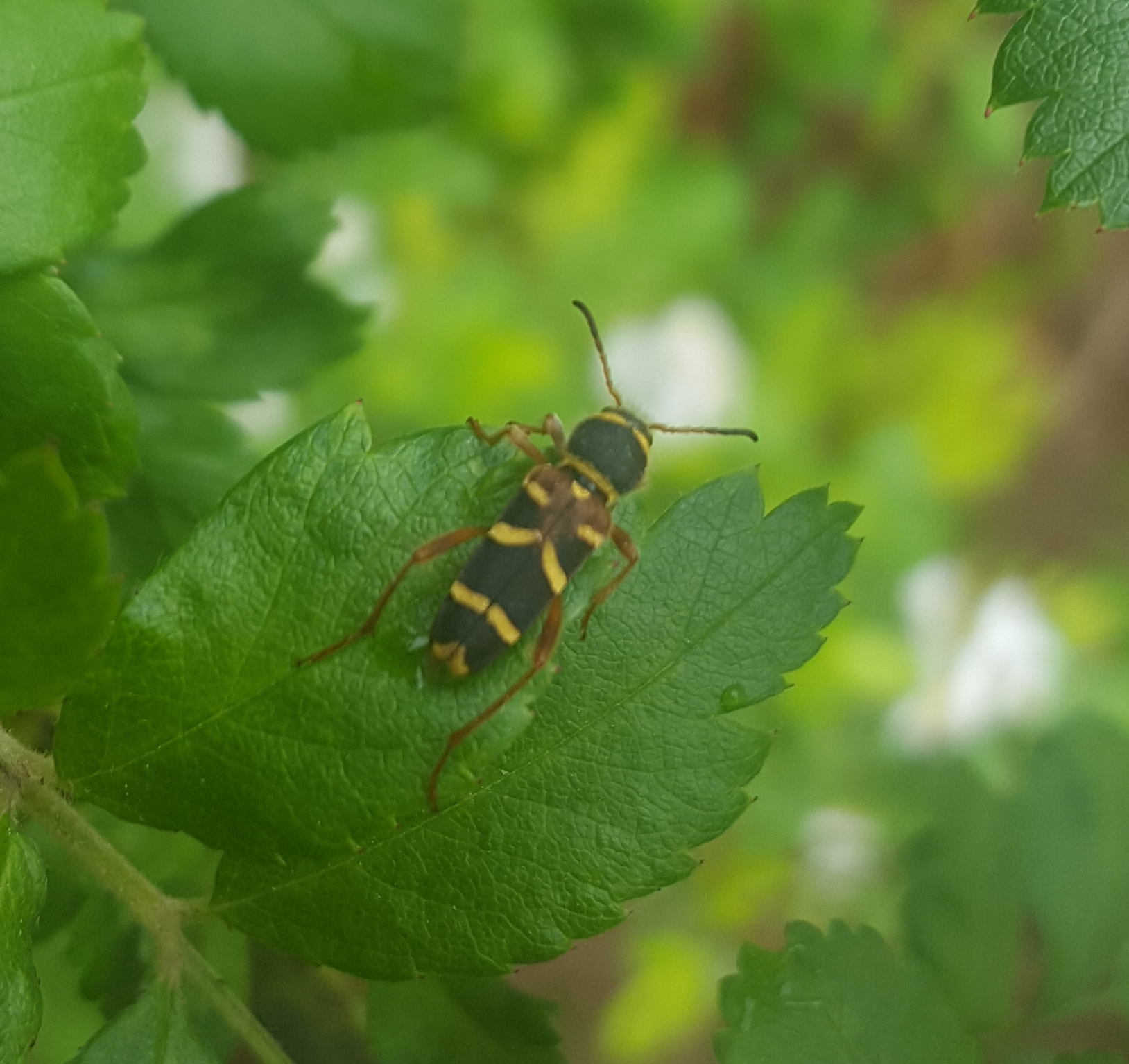

Scientific classification
- Domain: Eukaryota
- Kingdom: Animalia
- Phylum: Arthropoda
- Class: Insecta
- Order: Coleoptera
- Suborder: Polyphaga
- Infraorder: Cucujiformia
- Family: Cerambycidae
- Genus: Clytus
- Species: C. marginicollis

Binomial name
- Clytus marginicollis Laporte & Gory, 1835

= Clytus marginicollis =

Species of beetle

Clytus marginicollis is a species of beetle in the family Cerambycidae. It was described by Laporte and Gory in 1835. It is known for its distinctive appearance and is found in various regions, showcasing a diverse range of markings and colors.

== Description ==
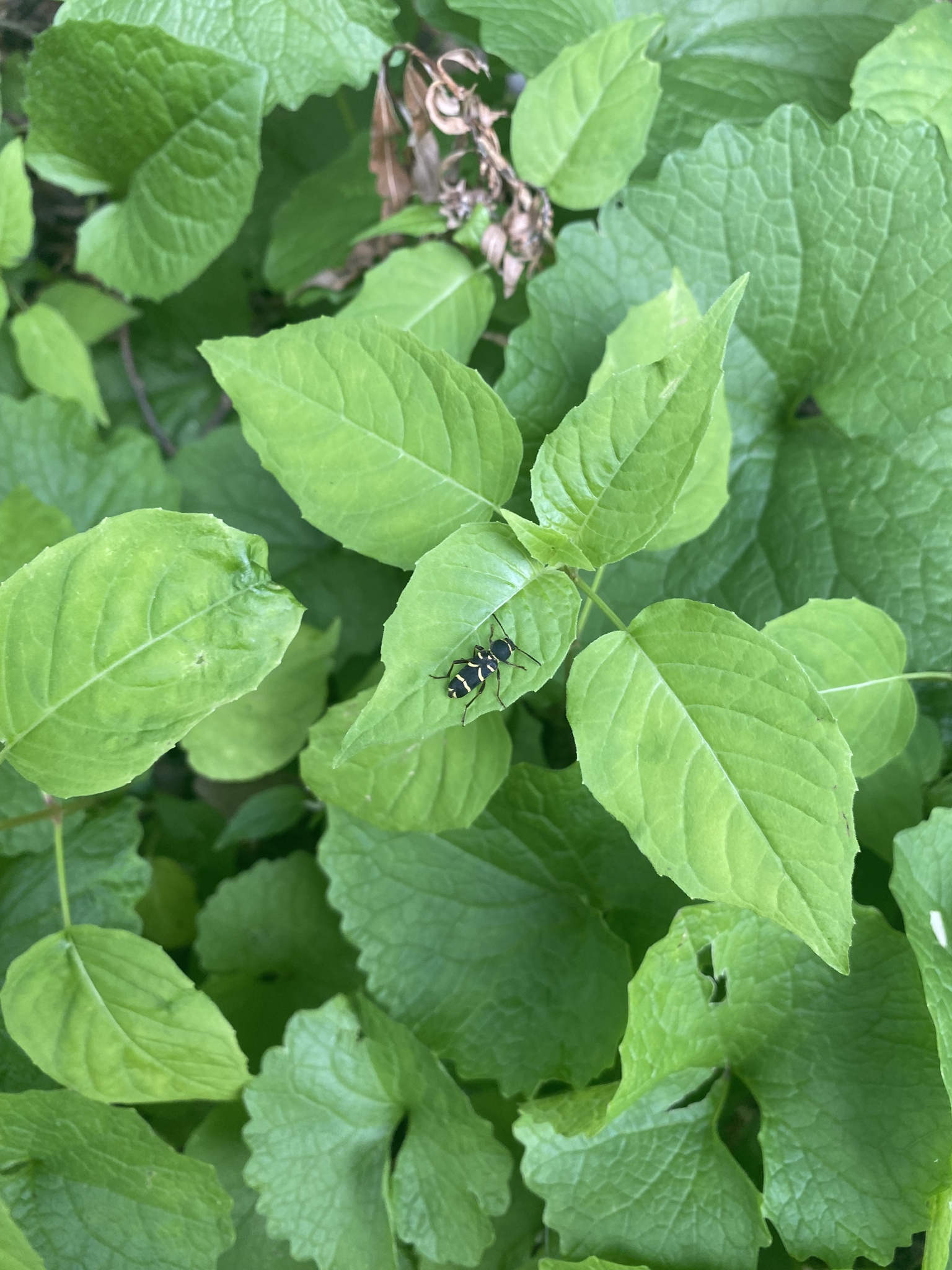
C. marginicollis on a leaf

C. marginicollis is a small, 6–10 mm (0.24–0.39 in) black beetle with yellow banding. It resembles a small hairy wasp. The larvae feed on dead pine branches, and adults are often found under the bark of pines.
