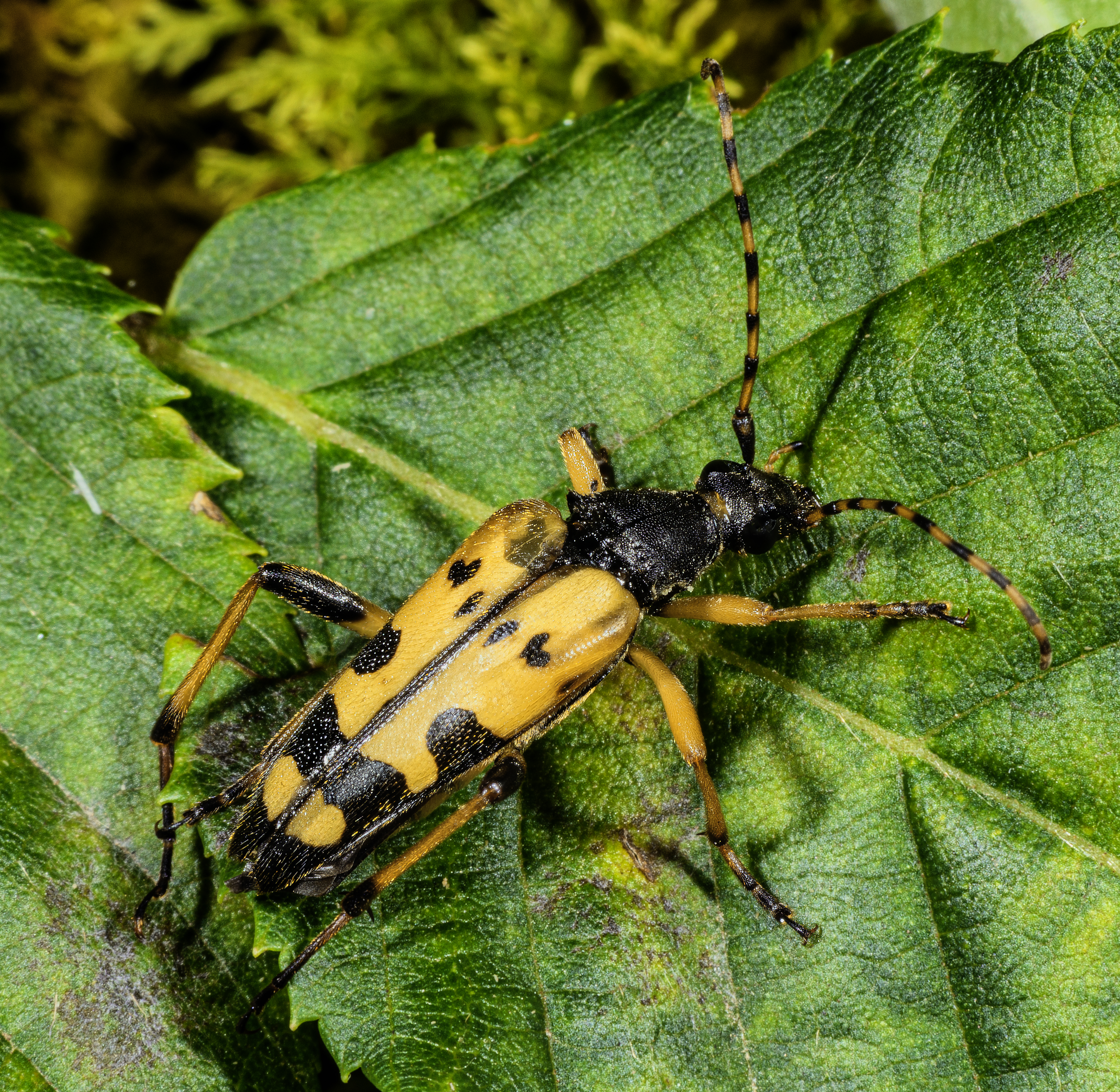
- Male
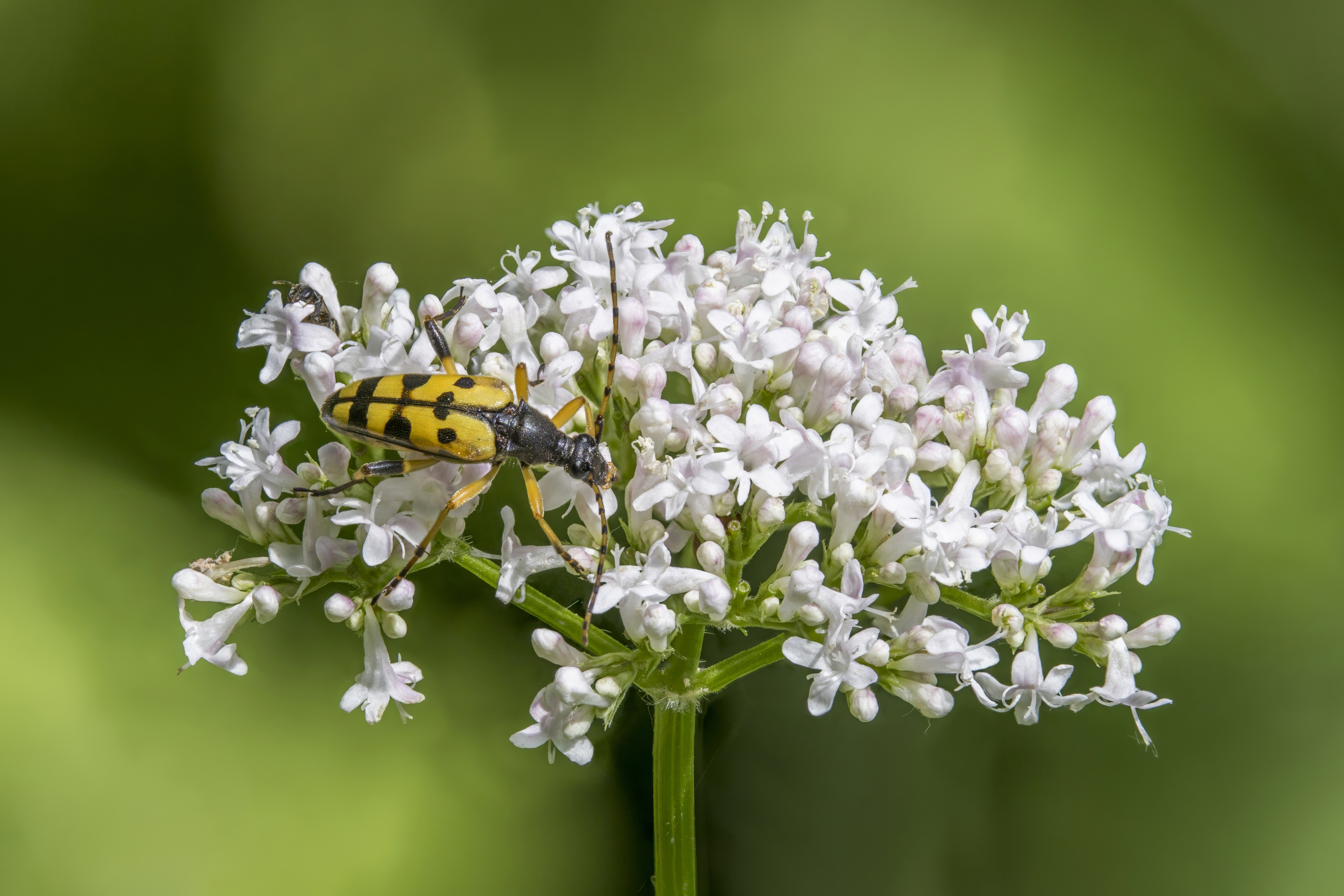
- Female

Scientific classification
- Kingdom: Animalia
- Phylum: Arthropoda
- Clade: Pancrustacea
- Class: Insecta
- Order: Coleoptera
- Suborder: Polyphaga
- Infraorder: Cucujiformia
- Family: Cerambycidae
- Genus: Rutpela
- Species: R. maculata

Binomial name
- Rutpela maculata (Poda, 1761)

Synonyms
- Leptura armata Herbst in Füssli, 1784; Leptura fasciata Scopoli, 1763; Leptura nigra Petagna, 1787 nec Linnaeus, 1758; Leptura quinquemaculata Gmelin, 1790; Leptura rubea Geoffroy, 1785; Rutpela maculata (Poda) Nakane & Ohbayashi, 1957; Stenocorus belga major Voet, 1806; Strangalia maculata P(Poda) Mulsant, 1863

= Rutpela maculata =

Species of beetle

Rutpela maculata, the spotted longhorn, is a beetle species of flower longhorns of the family Cerambycidae, subfamily Lepturinae.

== Varieties ==
Varieties within this species include:

- Rutpela maculata var. calcarata Olivier, 1790
- Rutpela maculata var. maculipes Podaný, 1950
- Rutpela maculata var. nigricornis (Stierlin, 1864)
- Rutpela maculata var. seminotata Kaufman, 1947
- Rutpela maculata var. subbinotata Podaný
- Rutpela maculata var. subsinuata Depoli
- Rutpela maculata var. undulata (Mulsant, 1839)
- Rutpela maculata var. subexternepunctata Podaný
- Rutpela maculata var. parumnotata Podaný
- Rutpela maculata var. subspinosa Fabricius, 1792
- Rutpela maculata var. subundulata Depoli, 1926
- Rutpela maculata var. subdisconotata Podaný
- Rutpela maculata var. sinuata Fabricius, 1792

== Distribution ==
This beetle is widespread in most of Europe, in the eastern Palearctic realm, and in the Near East (Albania, Austria, Belgium, Bulgaria, Corsica, Croatia, Czech Republic, Denmark, Finland, France, Germany, Greece, Hungary, Italy, Luxembourg, Netherlands, Norway, Poland, Portugal, Romania, Russia, Sardinia, Serbia, Sicily, Slovakia, Slovenia, Spain, Sweden, Switzerland, Syria, Turkey, and the United Kingdom).

== Description ==
The adults grow up to 13–20 millimetres (0.51–0.79 in). The head and pronotum are dark-brown, while elytra are yellowish, with black dots and stripes, rough imitations of wasps, which probably gives them some protection from birds.

mating (on Knautia arvensis)

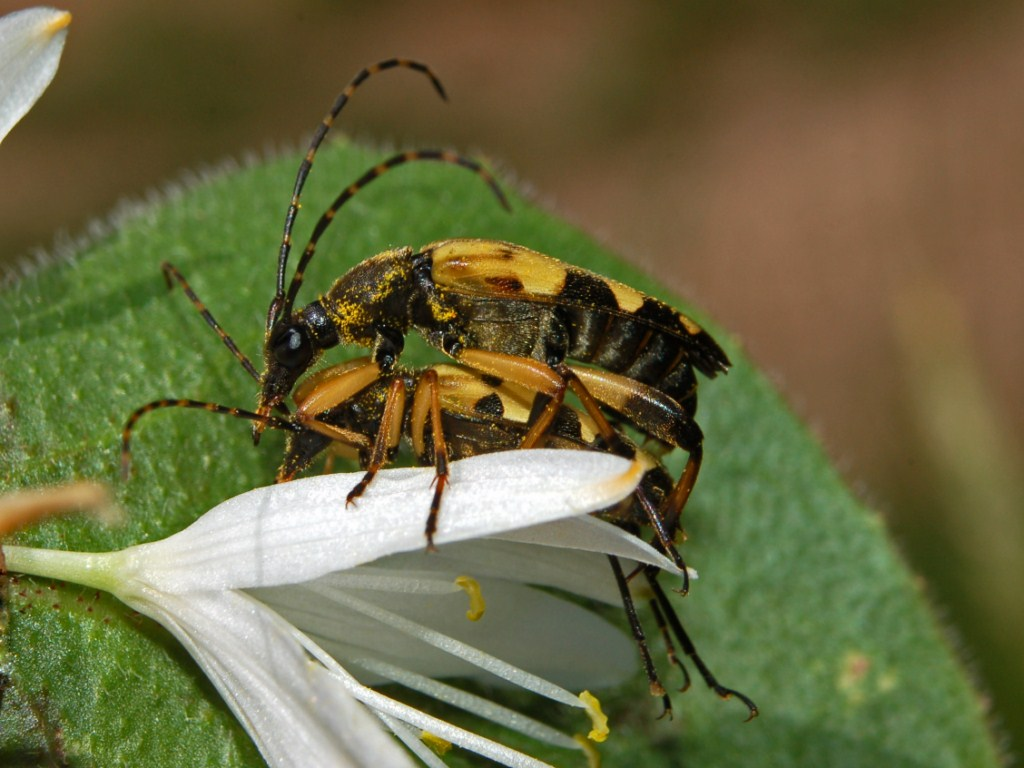
mating

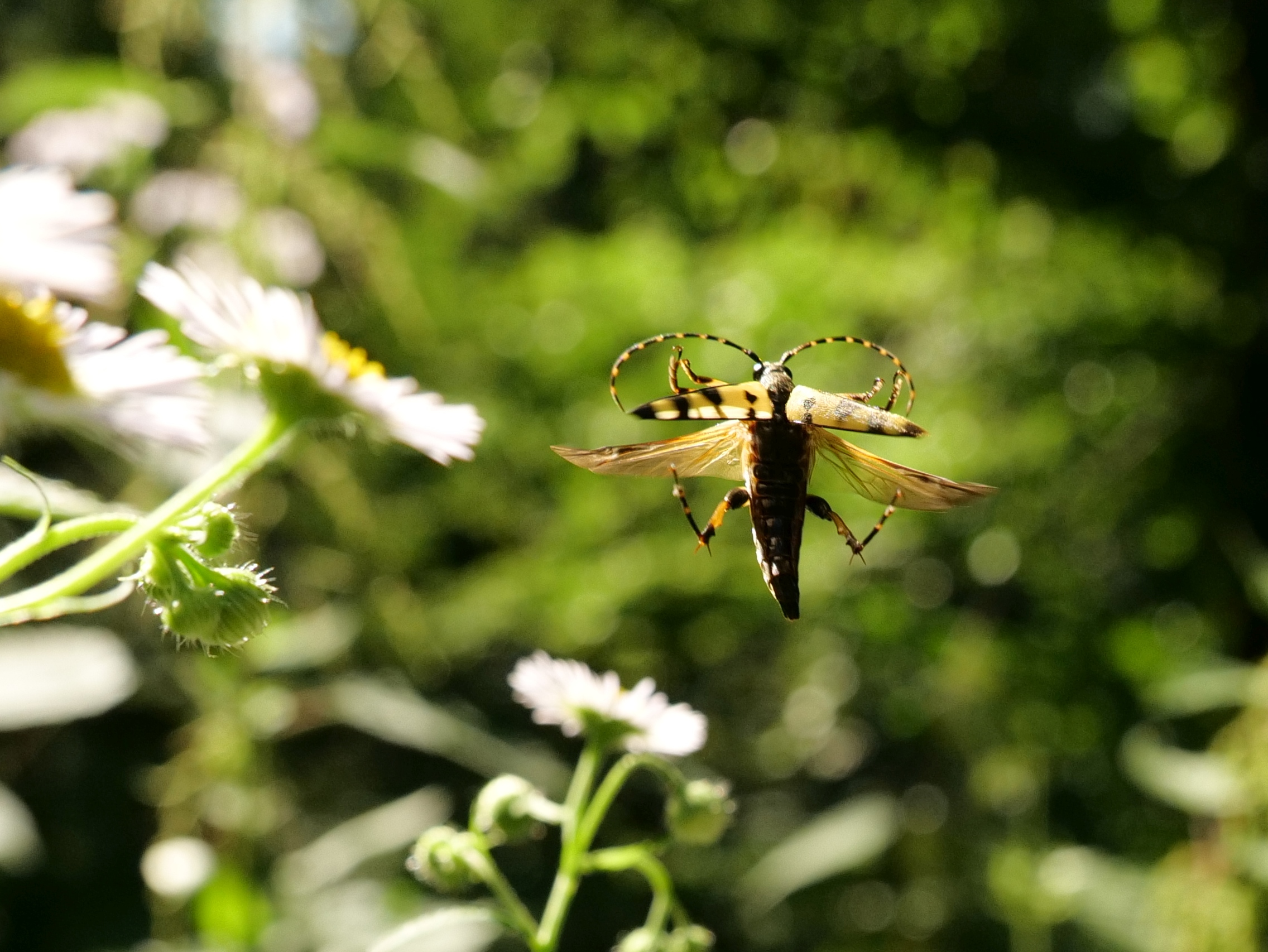
in-flight

== Biology ==
The species completes its life cycle in two to three years, spending most of their lives as larvae. The adults can be encountered from May to August; they are short-lived, only living for two to four weeks. They are very common flower-visitors, especially Apiaceae species, feeding on pollen and the nectar. The larvae are polyphagous in the wood of deciduous trees, mainly feeding on Corylus avellana, Fagus sylvatica, Castanea sativa and Ostrya carpinifolia, as well as on Quercus, Carpinus, Salix, Alnus, Populus and Betula species.

== See also ==
- Clytus arietis, another common wasp-mimicking longhorn beetle.
