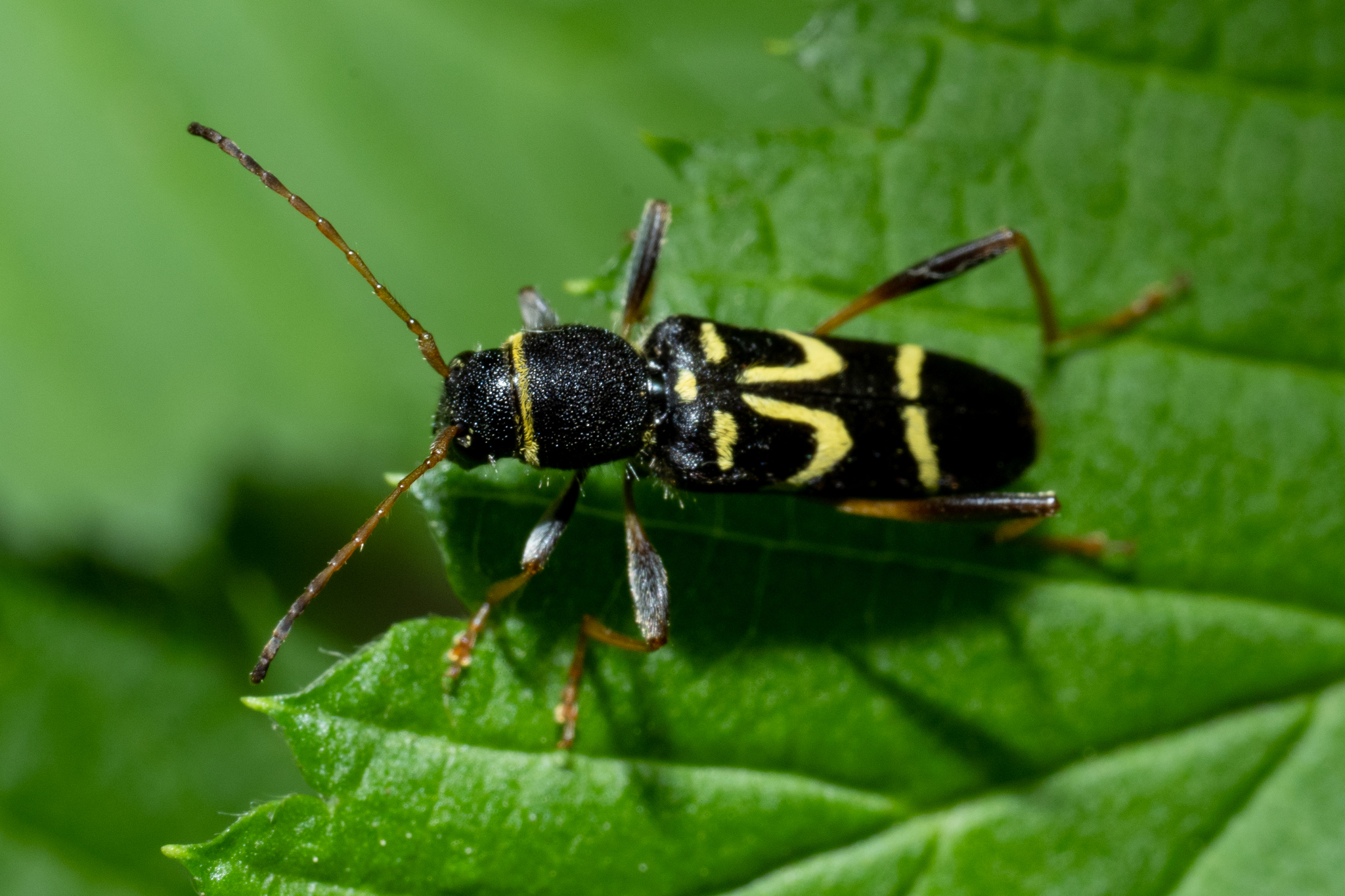

Scientific classification
- Domain: Eukaryota
- Kingdom: Animalia
- Phylum: Arthropoda
- Class: Insecta
- Order: Coleoptera
- Suborder: Polyphaga
- Infraorder: Cucujiformia
- Family: Cerambycidae
- Genus: Clytus
- Species: C. ruricola

Binomial name
- Clytus ruricola (Olivier, 1795)

= Clytus ruricola =

Species of beetle

Clytus ruricola is a species of beetle in the family Cerambycidae. It was described by Olivier in 1795.
