= Clytus chemsaki =

Scientific classification
- Domain: Eukaryota
- Kingdom: Animalia
- Phylum: Arthropoda
- Class: Insecta
- Order: Coleoptera
- Suborder: Polyphaga
- Infraorder: Cucujiformia
- Family: Cerambycidae
- Genus: Clytus
- Species: C. chemsaki

Binomial name
- Clytus chemsaki Hovore & Giesbert, 1974

Species of beetle

Clytus chemsaki is a species of beetle in the family Cerambycidae. It was described by Hovore and Giesbert in 1974.
