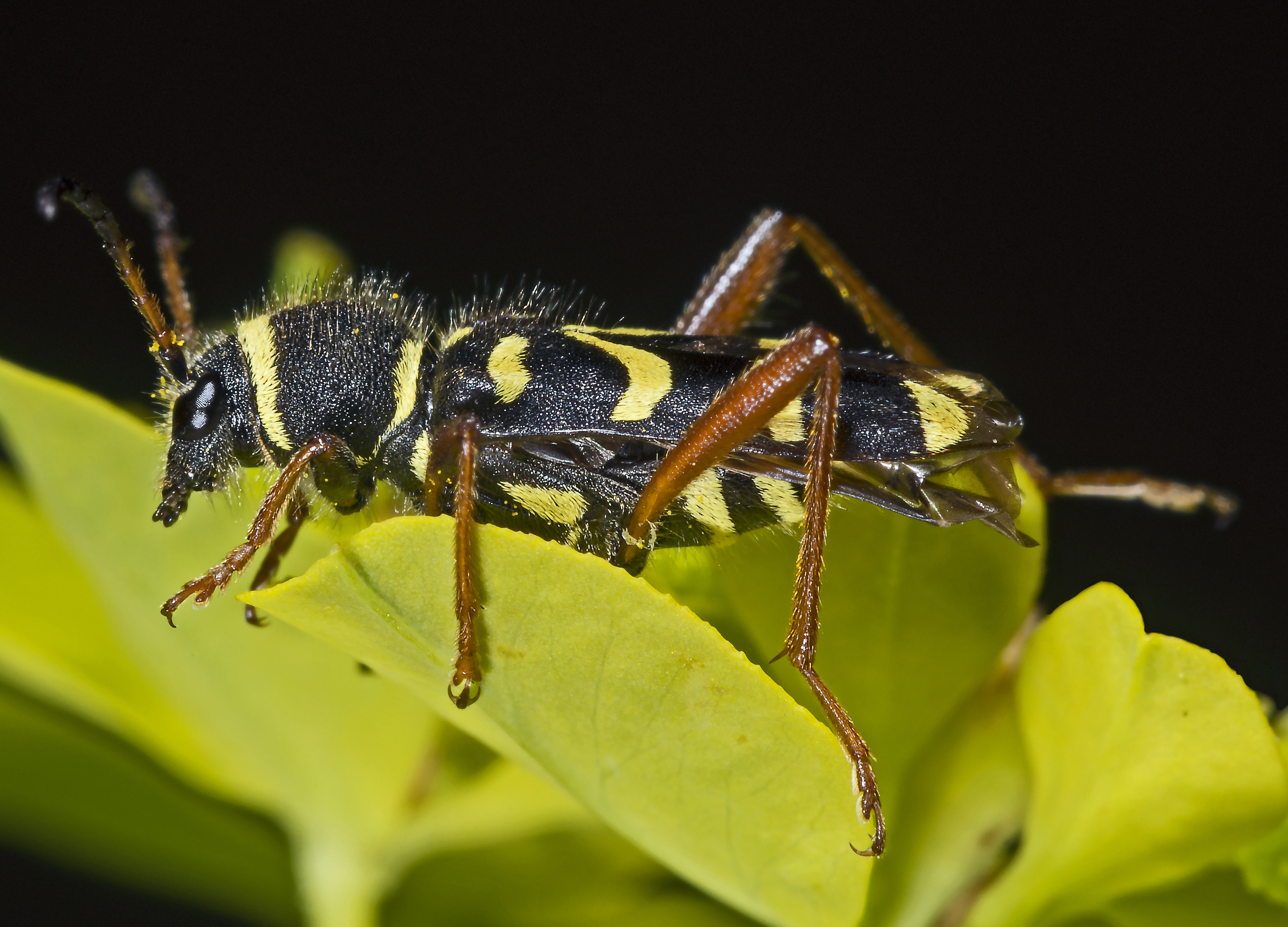
- Clytus arietis

Scientific classification
- Domain: Eukaryota
- Kingdom: Animalia
- Phylum: Arthropoda
- Class: Insecta
- Order: Coleoptera
- Suborder: Polyphaga
- Infraorder: Cucujiformia
- Family: Cerambycidae
- Subfamily: Cerambycinae
- Tribe: Clytini
- Genus: Clytus; Laicharting, 1784

= Clytus =

Genus of longhorn beetles

Clytus is a genus of longhorn beetles in the family Cerambycidae.

== Species ==
- Clytus ambigenus Chevrolat, 1882
- Clytus angustefasciatus Pic, 1943
- Clytus arietis (Linnaeus, 1758)
- Clytus arietoides Reitter, 1900
- Clytus auripilis Bates, 1884
- Clytus balwanti Gardner, 1942
- Clytus bellus Holzschuh, 1998
- Clytus blaisdelli Van Dyke, 1920
- Clytus buglanicus Kadlec, 2005
- Clytus canadensis Hopping, 1928
- Clytus ceylonicus Gardner, 1939
- Clytus chemsaki Hovore & Giesbert, 1974
- Clytus chiangmaiensis Viktora, 2019
- Clytus ciliciensis (Chevrolat, 1863)
- Clytus clavicornis Reiche, 1860
- Clytus clitellarius (Van Dyke, 1920)
- Clytus depilis Holzschuh, 2019
- Clytus dongziensis Viktora, 2020
- Clytus famosus Viktora & Liu, 2018
- Clytus fibularis Holzschuh, 2003
- Clytus fulvohirsutus Pic, 1904
- Clytus gulekanus Pic, 1904
- Clytus incanus Newman, 1842
- Clytus kabateki Sama, 1997
- Clytus kumalariensis Johanides, 2001
- Clytus lama Mulsant, 1850
- Clytus larvatus Gressitt, 1939
- Clytus madoni Pic, 1890
- Clytus marginicollis Laporte & Gory, 1841
- Clytus mayeti Théry, 1892
- Clytus melaenus Bates, 1884
- Clytus minutissimus Nonfried, 1894
- Clytus minutus Gardner, 1939
- Clytus montesuma Laporte & Gory, 1841
- Clytus nigritulus Kraatz, 1879
- Clytus orientalis Kano, 1933
- Clytus pacificus (Van Dyke, 1920)
- Clytus paradisiacus Rapuzzi & Jeniš, 2015
- Clytus parvigranulatus Holzschuh, 2006
- Clytus peyroni Pic, 1899
- Clytus planifrons (LeConte, 1874)
- Clytus qingmaiensis Viktora, 2020
- Clytus quadraticollis Ganglbauer, 1889
- Clytus raddensis Pic, 1904
- Clytus rhamni Germar, 1817
- Clytus rufoapicalis Pic, 1917
- Clytus rufobasalis Pic, 1917
- Clytus ruricola (Olivier, 1800)
- Clytus schneideri inapicalis Pic, 1895
- Clytus schneideri Kiesenwetter, 1879
- Clytus schurmanni Sama, 1996
- Clytus signifer Marseul, 1875
- Clytus simulator Nonfried, 1894
- Clytus solitarius Pascoe, 1869
- Clytus taurusiensis Pic, 1903
- Clytus triangulimacula Costa, 1847
- Clytus trifolionotatus Gressitt & Rondon, 1970
- Clytus tropicus (Panzer, 1795)
- Clytus unicolor (Kano, 1933)
- Clytus validus Fairmaire, 1896
- Clytus viridescens Matsushita, 1933

== Species of uncertain placement (incertae sedis) ==
- Clytus carinatus Laporte & Gory, 1841
- †Clytus pervetustus (Cockerell, 1920) (fossil)
- Clytus punctulatus Donovan, 1805
- Clytus sexmaculatus Donovan, 1805
