= Clytus montesuma =

Scientific classification
- Domain: Eukaryota
- Kingdom: Animalia
- Phylum: Arthropoda
- Class: Insecta
- Order: Coleoptera
- Suborder: Polyphaga
- Infraorder: Cucujiformia
- Family: Cerambycidae
- Genus: Clytus
- Species: C. montesuma

Binomial name
- Clytus montesuma Laporte & Gory, 1835

Species of beetle

Clytus montesuma is a species of beetle in the family Cerambycidae. It was described by Laporte and Gory in 1835.
