= Clytus clitellarius =

Scientific classification
- Domain: Eukaryota
- Kingdom: Animalia
- Phylum: Arthropoda
- Class: Insecta
- Order: Coleoptera
- Suborder: Polyphaga
- Infraorder: Cucujiformia
- Family: Cerambycidae
- Genus: Clytus
- Species: C. clitellarius

Binomial name
- Clytus clitellarius (Van Dyke, 1920)

Species of beetle

Clytus clitellarius is a species of beetle in the family Cerambycidae. It was described by Van Dyke in 1920.
