= Clytus carinatus =

Scientific classification
- Kingdom: Animalia
- Phylum: Arthropoda
- Class: Insecta
- Order: Coleoptera
- Suborder: Polyphaga
- Infraorder: Cucujiformia
- Family: Cerambycidae
- Genus: Clytus
- Species: C. carinatus

Binomial name
- Clytus carinatus Laporte & Gory, 1835

Species of beetle

Clytus carinatus is a putative species of beetle in the family Cerambycidae. It was described by Laporte and Gory in 1835, but its identity is unknown: it is presently considered incertae sedis, so it is unclear what genus it belongs to, and it is likely to be a synonym of some other described cerambycid species from North America.
