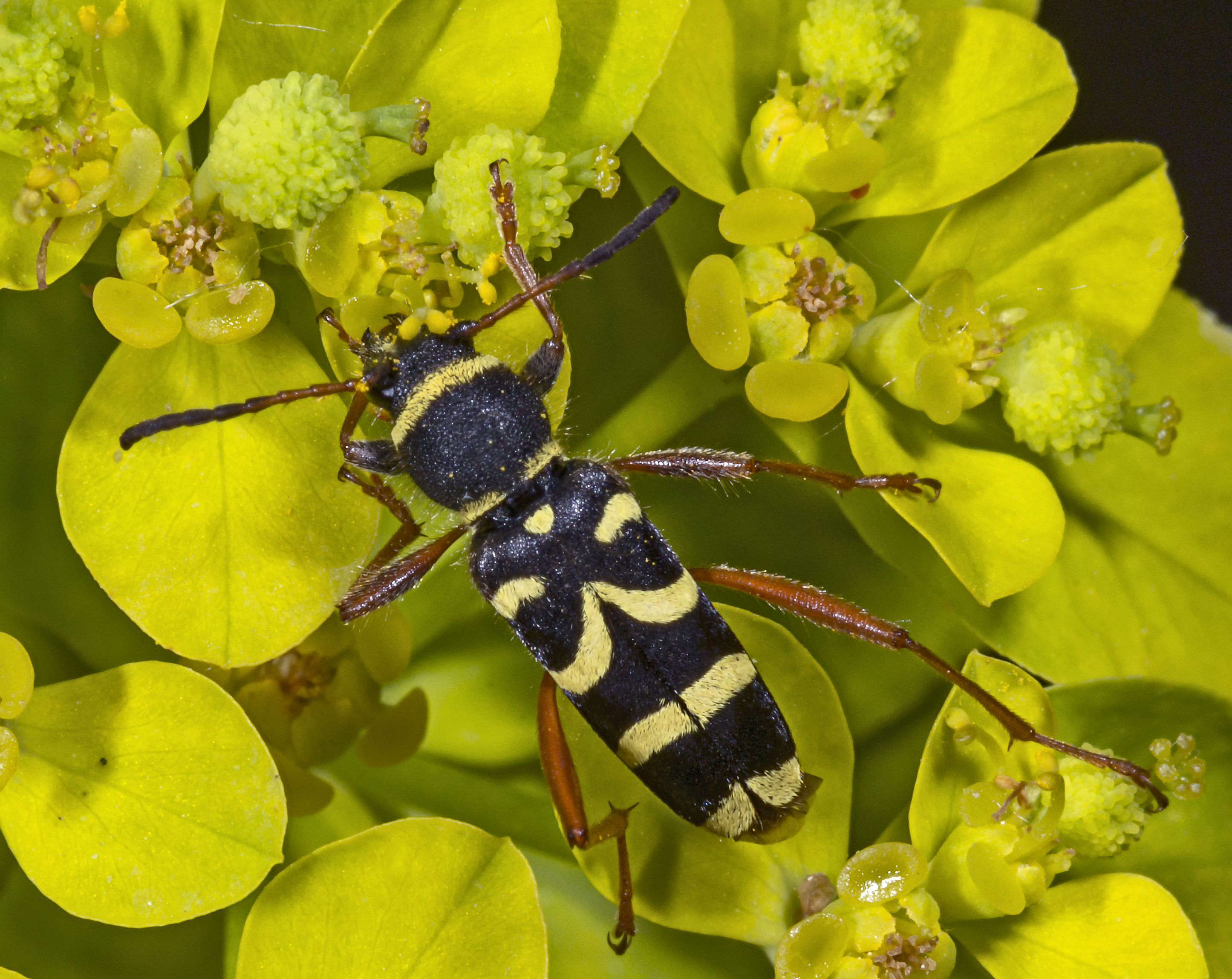

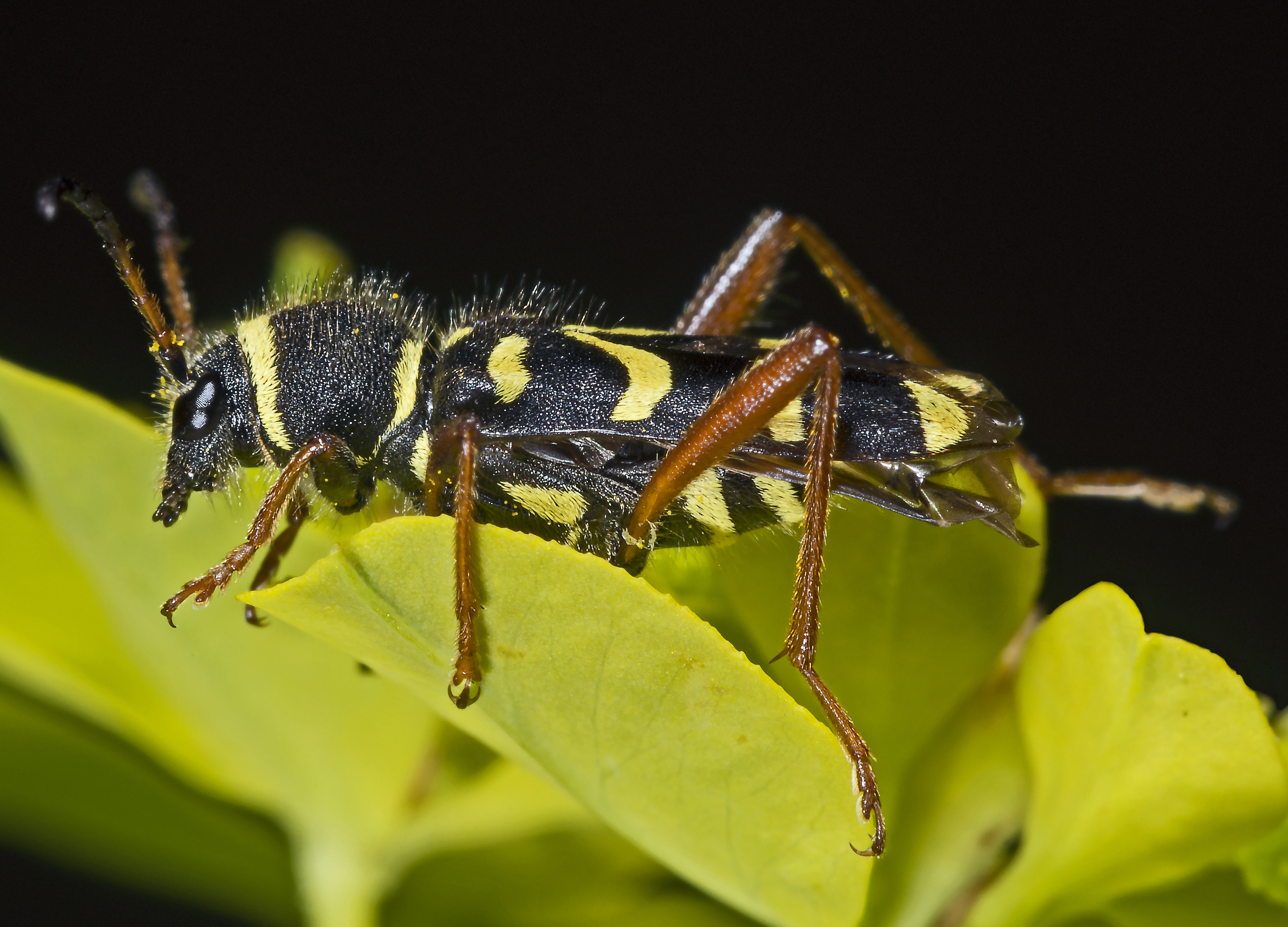

Conservation status
- Least Concern (IUCN 3.1)

Scientific classification
- Kingdom: Animalia
- Phylum: Arthropoda
- Clade: Pancrustacea
- Class: Insecta
- Order: Coleoptera
- Suborder: Polyphaga
- Infraorder: Cucujiformia
- Family: Cerambycidae
- Genus: Clytus
- Species: C. arietis

Binomial name
- Clytus arietis (Linnaeus, 1758)

= Clytus arietis =

Species of insect

Clytus arietis on blackberry

Clytus arietis, the wasp beetle, is a wasp-mimicking longhorn beetle species in the genus Clytus belonging to the family Cerambycidae. Renowned for its mimicry of wasps, this beetle exhibits black and yellow coloration and behaviors that deter potential predators.

Measuring between 9 and 18 millimeters in length, Clytus arietis is prevalent across Europe and is typically observed from May to July. Adults are frequently found on flowers and decaying wood, where they feed on pollen. The larvae develop in dead or decaying wood, playing a role in the decomposition process. Despite their wasp-like appearance, wasp beetles are harmless to humans and contribute to the ecosystem by aiding in wood decomposition.

== Physical description ==
It reaches 9–18 millimetres (0.35–0.71 in) in length. It features prominent yellow and black patterns along its head and abdomen, in what is believed to be an evolutionary attempt to mimic wasps and avoid predation. It also possesses thin legs and antennae that move in small, quick movements, which supports the wasp-mimicking hypothesis. It has relatively short antennae compared to other beetles of the same Family. Usually, other longhorn beetles will also have more pointed bodies in comparison.

See here for a very detailed physical description that can be used for species identification.

The wasp beetle has very little variation in its markings, and colour varieties are very rare. A variety lacking the yellow V shaped elytral mark (var. medioniger Allen) is described by Allen (1959). See more information.

Its larvae are small white grubs that live in deadwood, like old fence posts.

== Geographic range ==
The wasp beetle has been spotted throughout Europe, ranging from Portugal to Southwestern Russia and Southern Norway to Southern Italy. It is widespread in England and Wales, and rare in Scotland.

== Habitat ==
The wasp beetle's habitat includes farmlands, woodlands, towns and gardens. Adults may be seen visiting flowers far from any obviously suitable habitat, such as in flower pots in urban areas. For breeding areas, it prefers hedgerow vegetation and well-wooded areas.

== Development ==
The larvae live in warm, dry dead wood, such as fence posts and dead branches. They particularly favour willow and birch, but have been seen using a wide range of broadleaf species including Acer, Betula, Castanea, Crataegus, Fagus, Pyrus, Tilia, Salix and Ulmus. They have also been recorded developing in Juniperus and Picea abies. Sometimes eggs hatch out of firewood that has been brought into the house to dry over winter. The eggs are laid under the bark, and larvae initially live there, consuming the plant matter. When about half-grown they tunnel into the xylem of the host organism. When fully grown, they construct a pupal cell, parallel to the wood grain, around 3–5 cm long at the end of the tunnel. Pupation occurs either during September or October or in the spring of the following year.

Adults feed on flowers along woodland rides and hedgerows during the summer.

== Reproduction ==
Reproduction in this species happens when adult beetles emerge throughout spring and lay eggs in deadwood.

Research around sexual behaviours and courtship of Clytus arietis is quite dated, with many sources from the 1960s. A paper from 1963 states that both male and female wasp beetles engage in a "courtship song", without offering further explanation.

In this species and other similar ones, "licking" behaviour by the male is also described in studies one or more times during courtship. This is described as the palps exerting a stroking action on the back of the female. In some species, this movement only occurs when the female is restless, so it has been proposed that it is a calming action. For Clytus arietis, the "licking" is combined with a "tapping" movement, when the male rhythmically "ducks" their head towards the female's thorax, "lick-tapping" them. This is very likely a stimulus for the female's sake, but there is a research gap here, as it may also be a stimulus to the male. During this "lick-tapping" movement, chemoreceptors in the palps would have a concentrated smell of the female.

In a few beetles within the same subfamily Lepturinae, the males establish copulation by mounting the females with their head placed over the female's and grasping an antenna with their mouthparts. They pull on the antennae until they are copulating, with the male's abdomen probing down to make contact with the female's ovipositor. With copulation undergoing successfully, the male then releases the antennae and performs the aforementioned "lick-tapping" movement to calm the female. Copulation in total lasts 10 to 40 minutes, with an average of 20 minutes.

== Lifespan ==
The entire life cycle of the wasp beetle generally takes two years but adults can finish development and emerge from furniture after several years.

The adult beetle has a relatively short life, emerging in May to find a mate and reproduce. Once mated, the adult generation will die at the end of the summer, leaving offspring to emerge either in the Fall or in the next Spring.

Adults forage for food and look for mates from April until July.

== Behaviour ==
The wasp beetle flies well in sunshine from May to July, often visiting flowers for pollen and nectar. It is harmless but is protected by its wasp-like colours and movements, making it a Batesian mimic. It also emanates a wasp buzz-like noise when threatened, even though it is harmless. They can be seen wandering around on flowers from late spring to early summer, and they are easily mistaken for wasps. They are not to be confused with another wasp-mimicking longhorn beetle, Rutpela maculata. Other similar species commonly confused for the Clytus arietis include the Clytus ruricola , the Xylotrechus undulatus, and the Plagionotus arcuatus.

This behaviour by insects of mimicking other species was first articulated by Henry Walter Bates in the Brazilian rainforest. He observed a day-flying moth mimicking a wasp and wrote "the imitation is intended to protect the otherwise defenceless insect by deceiving insectivorous animals, which persecute the moth, but avoid the wasp." This behaviour is overwhelmingly seen in tropical insects, but has also been seen in vertebrates, invertebrates, and plants.

== Senses ==
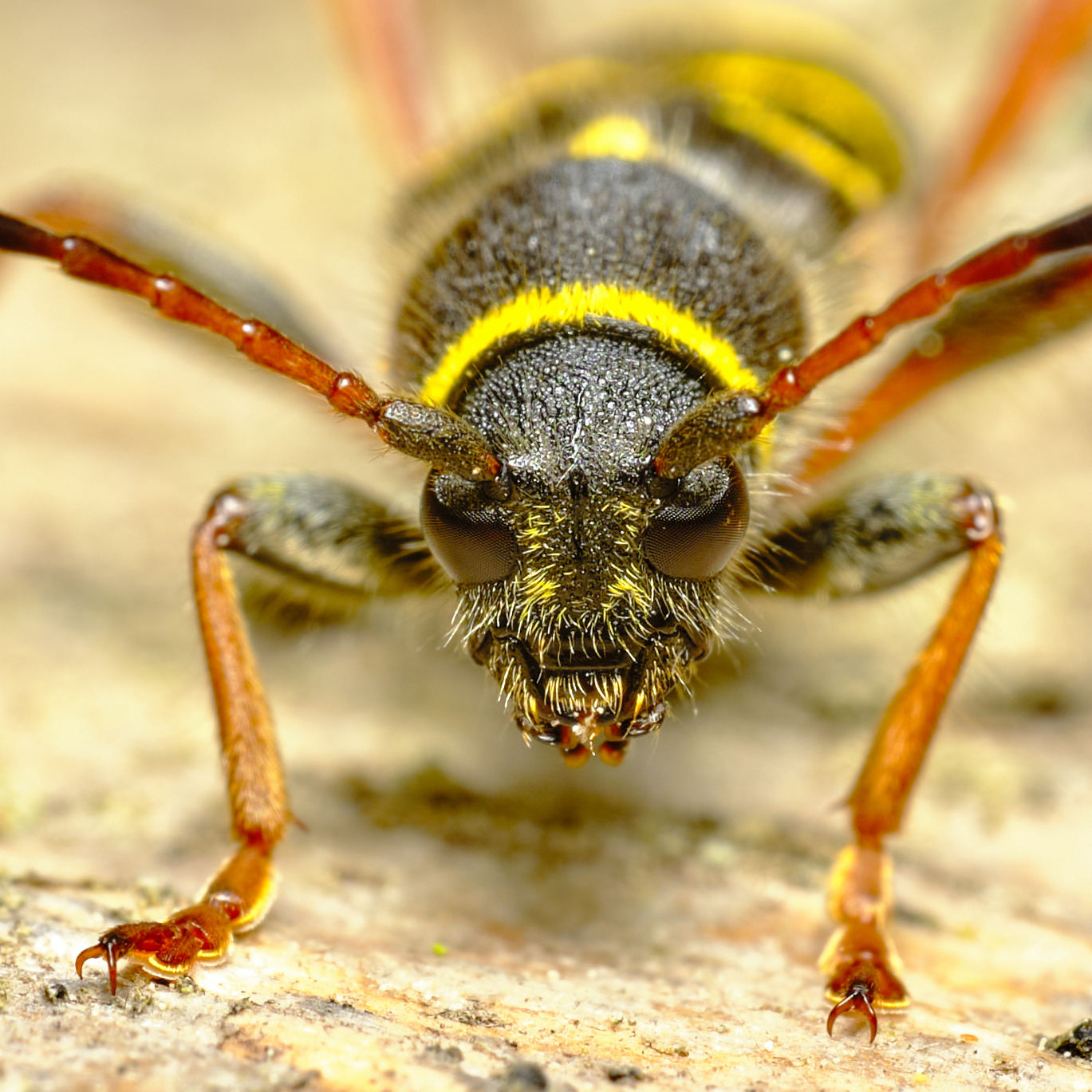
Clytus arietis head-on

Research about the senses and communication methods of Clytus arietis specifically has not been done, but there is some research available about other beetles in the family Cerambycidae. This presents another interesting research opportunity for this species.

As an example, the senses of the species Glenea cantor (also in the family Cerambycidae) were thoroughly analyzed in a 2020 paper, which showed that the sensors, or sensilla throughout its body are largely consistent with those reported for other long-horned beetle species. Antennae on this species have predominantly olfactory and gustatory sensilla. On the joints and abdomen, the beetle holds most of its mechanical sensilla, possibly because these body parts are more involved in mechanical sensing. Other studies have supported that the density of sensors is closely related to their function.

== Communication ==
There is no research available for the communication of Clytus arietis, but there is research for the family Cerambycidae.

Adults in the Cerambycidae family are attracted to plant volatile chemicals (from inflorescences fed on by adults as well as from trunk and leaf volatiles of larval hosts), to the pheromones of bark beetles, and to their own long- and short-range sex pheromones. Non-host plant chemicals in some cases repel Cerambycids during host selection and some Cerambycids may use defensive compounds to avoid predation. Chemical cues also regulate oviposition through stimulating the female at available host plants and through deterrence at occupied or unsuitable host plants.

== Food habits ==
Adult wasp beetles feed on pollen and occasionally small insects. It has been hypothesized that this may be particularly so for the female to provide protein for egg production. Among the most frequently visited flowers by adults are Umbels (Apiaceae) and dog rose.

Larvae feed on dry deciduous deadwood where they are also housed for the winter.

== Predation ==
The most common predators of the wasp beetle are birds.

Although as mentioned above, it is theorized that the Batesian mimicry exhibited by the Wasp Beetle is to avoid predation, there is little research on its effectiveness. Recent research done in 2023 investigated this and an overall difference in predation between mimics and beetles without mimicry was not observed, but predation risk increased with canopy openness, bird abundance, and exposure time, which peaked in July. This shows that environmental factors have a higher importance for predation risk than the actual coloration of the beetles.

== Ecosystem roles ==
Clytus arietis and other Cerambycidae beetles are only a small part of the biodiversity of many ecosystems throughout Europe, as well as Mediterranean ecosystems in Spain.

Saproxylic beetles (beetles dependent on dead and decaying wood for their lifecycle) play an essential role in these ecosystems by taking part in decomposition processes essential for the nutrient cycle and by interacting with other groups of organisms which are also important for the well-being and economy of the ecosystem, such as mites, nematodes, bacteria and fungi. Beetles carry these organisms from tree to tree, aiding their spread throughout the habitat. Beetles also play a major role in pollination.

Significant long-term concerns for Saproxylic species include loss of habitat due to logging and wood harvesting and the decline of older, old-growth trees throughout the landscape, as well as the lack of land management strategies aimed at recruiting new tree generations. More short-term and localized threats come from sanitation works and the removal of old trees due to safety concerns in places subject to intense human use.

== Economic importance ==
Clytus arietis and other Saproxylic beetles are economically important due to their maintenance role in many ecosystems.

C. arietis is especially economically important due to its level of pollination, since adults rely on pollen for sustenance. This is important for many economic activities such as agriculture.

== Conservation status ==
This is a common species of no conservation concern. It is widespread in England and Wales, being fairly common in Leicestershire and Rutland. It is scarcer in Scotland.

The Wasp Beetle is native to where it is found throughout Europe, according to recent sources.

== Taxonomic status ==
This species was named by Carl Linnaeus in 1758. It was added to the suborder polyphaga by Emery in 1886. In 1802, Latreille added it to the superfamily chrysomeloidea, the family cerambycidae and the subfamily cerambycinae. Additionally, in 1839, Mulsant added it to the tribe clytini and Laicharting added it to the genus Clytus in 1784.

According to BioLib.cz, there are three subspecies of Clytus arietis, which include Clytus arietis arietis named by Linnaeus in 1758, Clytus arietis lederi named by Ganglbauer in 1881, and Clytus arietis oblitus, named by Roubal in 1932. These subspecies, however, are not supported by genetic data as seen in the Barcode of Life Data System (BOLD).

Although this species is well documented throughout the Biodiversity Heritage Library, no type specimen is known.

== Genetic data ==
=== Phylogeny ===
Up until 2021, the tribe Clytini was considered monophyletic based on morphological analysis. A study published in 2021 challenged this hypothesis using three mitochondrial genes 12S rRNA 16S rRNA COI and two nuclear genes 18S rRNA 28S rRNA. It showed that the tribe contains three distinct clades. These are still unnamed, and further research is warranted.

=== Genes analyzed ===
Several genes have been analyzed as part of the International Barcode of Life and are available in the National Centre for Biotechnology Information (NCBI) GenBank These include the mitochondrial cytochrome oxidase subunit 1 (COI) gene and cytochrome c oxidase subunit I (COI) gene, the 18S ribosomal RNA gene, partial Su(var)3-9 gene exons 1-3 and partial eIF2g gene exons 1-2 and joined CDS features, partial eIF2g gene exon 7 and partial Su(var)3-9 gene exon 8, partial eIF2g gene exons 3-6 and partial Su(var)3-9 gene exons 4-7, heterochromatin protein sequence, and the initiation factor 2 gamma sequence.

The Barcode of Life Data System (BOLD) also has genetic information from Clytus arietis publicly available, but no whole genome has been recorded to date.

== See also ==
- Batesian mimicry
- Rutpela maculata – another common wasp-mimicking longhorn beetle
