= Batesiata tesserula =

Scientific classification
- Kingdom: Animalia
- Phylum: Arthropoda
- Class: Insecta
- Order: Coleoptera
- Family: Cerambycidae
- Genus: Batesiata
- Species: B. tesserula

Binomial name
- Batesiata tesserula (Charpentier, 1825)

Synonyms
- Brachyleptura tesserula (Charpentier, 1825); Leptura bisignata Ménétriés, 1832; Leptura tesserula Charpentier, 1825; Paracorymbia tesserula (Charpentier, 1825); Stictoleptura tesserula (Charpentier) Sama, 2002

Species of beetle

Batesiata tesserula is a species of longhorn beetle in the Lepturinae subfamily. It was described by Toussaint de Charpentier in 1825 and is found in Albania, Bulgaria, Czech Republic, Greece, Iran, Montenegro, Poland, Romania, Serbia, Slovakia, Turkey, and Ukraine. The females have much smaller prothorax than males. The species are black coloured with orange wings, that have a black dot on each of them. This is the only way to distinguish it from Brachyleptura fulva.
