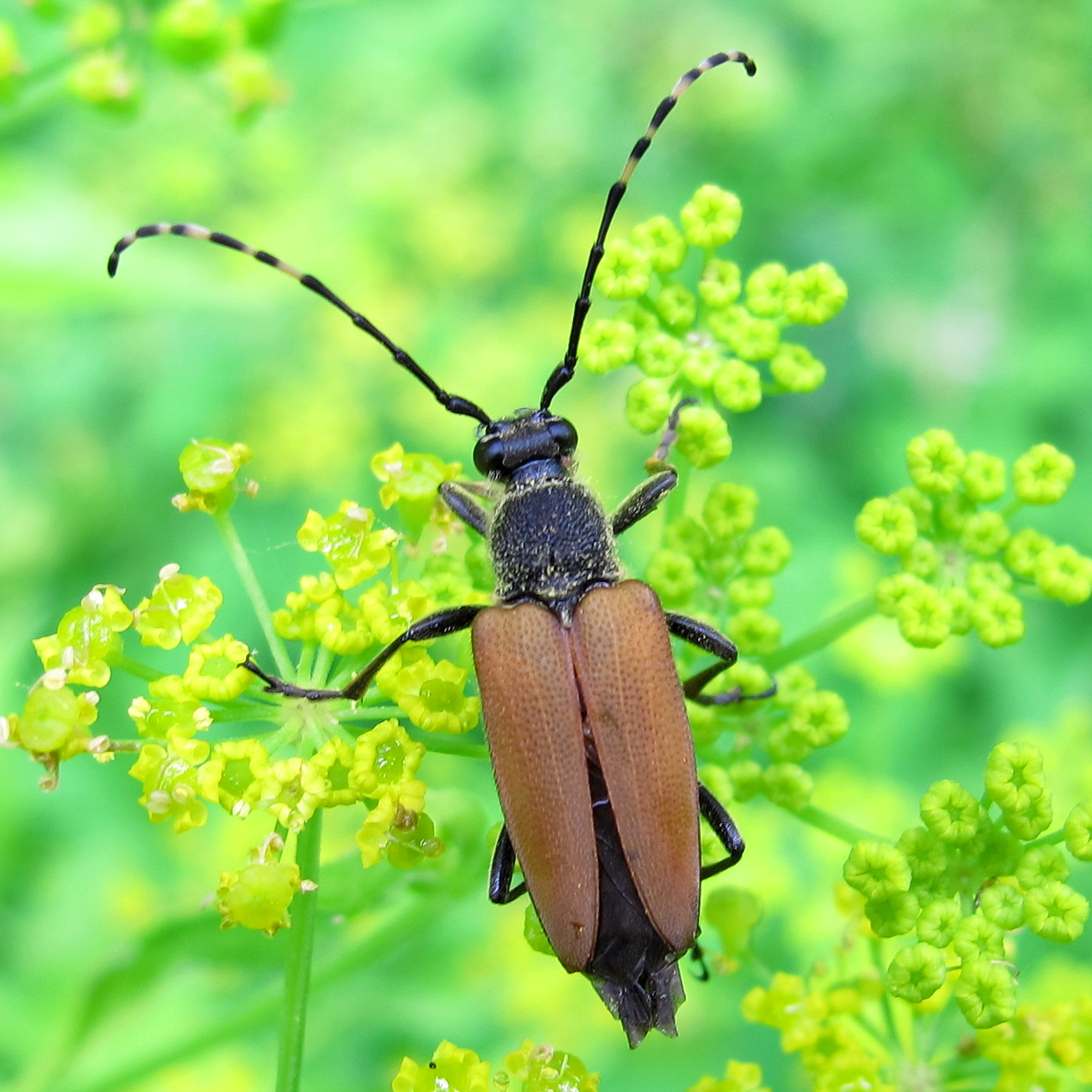

Scientific classification
- Kingdom: Animalia
- Phylum: Arthropoda
- Class: Insecta
- Order: Coleoptera
- Suborder: Polyphaga
- Infraorder: Cucujiformia
- Family: Cerambycidae
- Genus: Brachyleptura
- Species: B. rubrica

Binomial name
- Brachyleptura rubrica (Say, 1824)

= Brachyleptura rubrica =

Species of beetle

Brachyleptura rubrica is a species of beetle in the family Cerambycidae. It was described by Thomas Say in 1824. It feeds on various Spiraea species.

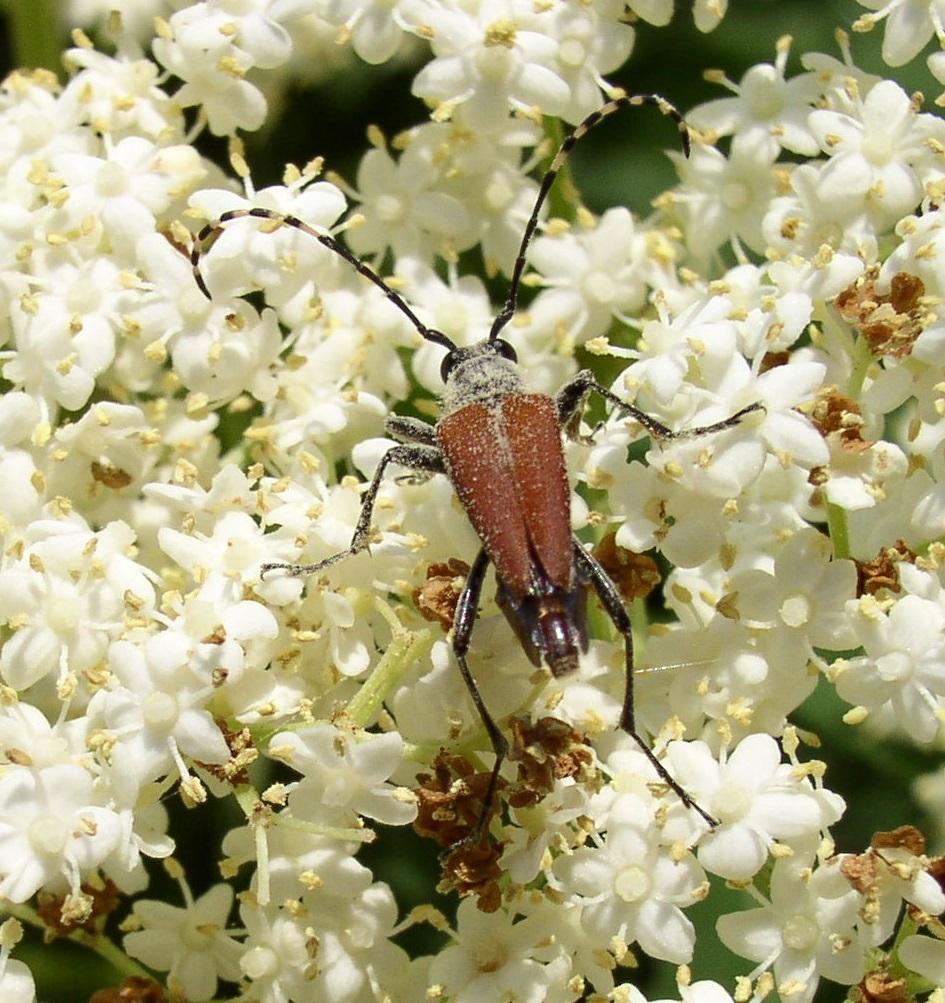
Brachyleptura rubrica
