= Brachyleptura dehiscens =

Scientific classification
- Kingdom: Animalia
- Phylum: Arthropoda
- Class: Insecta
- Order: Coleoptera
- Suborder: Polyphaga
- Infraorder: Cucujiformia
- Family: Cerambycidae
- Genus: Brachyleptura
- Species: B. dehiscens

Binomial name
- Brachyleptura dehiscens (LeConte, 1859)

Species of beetle

Brachyleptura dehiscens is a species of beetle in the family Cerambycidae. It was described by John Lawrence LeConte in 1859.
