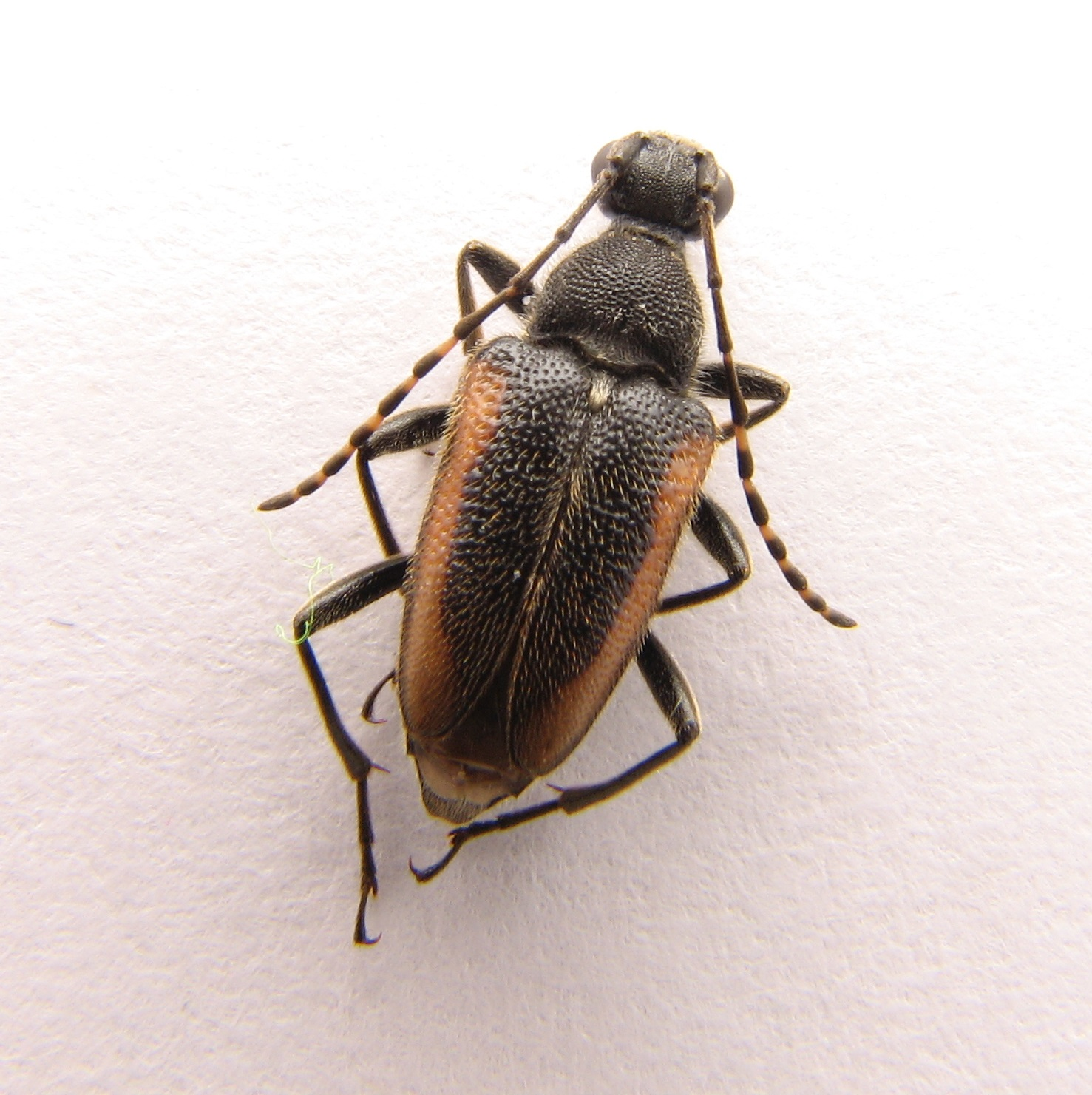
- Brachyleptura champlaini

Scientific classification
- Kingdom: Animalia
- Phylum: Arthropoda
- Class: Insecta
- Order: Coleoptera
- Suborder: Polyphaga
- Infraorder: Cucujiformia
- Family: Cerambycidae
- Subfamily: Lepturinae
- Tribe: Lepturini
- Genus: Brachyleptura; Casey, 1913

= Brachyleptura =

Genus of beetles

Brachyleptura is a genus of beetles in the family Cerambycidae, containing the following eight species:

- Brachyleptura champlaini Casey, 1913
- Brachyleptura circumdata (Olivier, 1795)
- Brachyleptura dehiscens (LeConte, 1859)
- Brachyleptura fulva
- Brachyleptura pernigra (Linell, 1897)
- Brachyleptura rubrica (Say, 1824)
- Brachyleptura vagans (Olivier, 1795)
- Brachyleptura vexatrix (Mannerheim, 1853)
