= Brachyleptura vexatrix =

Scientific classification
- Kingdom: Animalia
- Phylum: Arthropoda
- Class: Insecta
- Order: Coleoptera
- Suborder: Polyphaga
- Infraorder: Cucujiformia
- Family: Cerambycidae
- Genus: Brachyleptura
- Species: B. vexatrix

Binomial name
- Brachyleptura vexatrix (Mannerheim, 1853)

Species of beetle

Brachyleptura vexatrix is a species of beetle belonging to the family Cerambycidae. It was described by Mannerheim in 1853.
