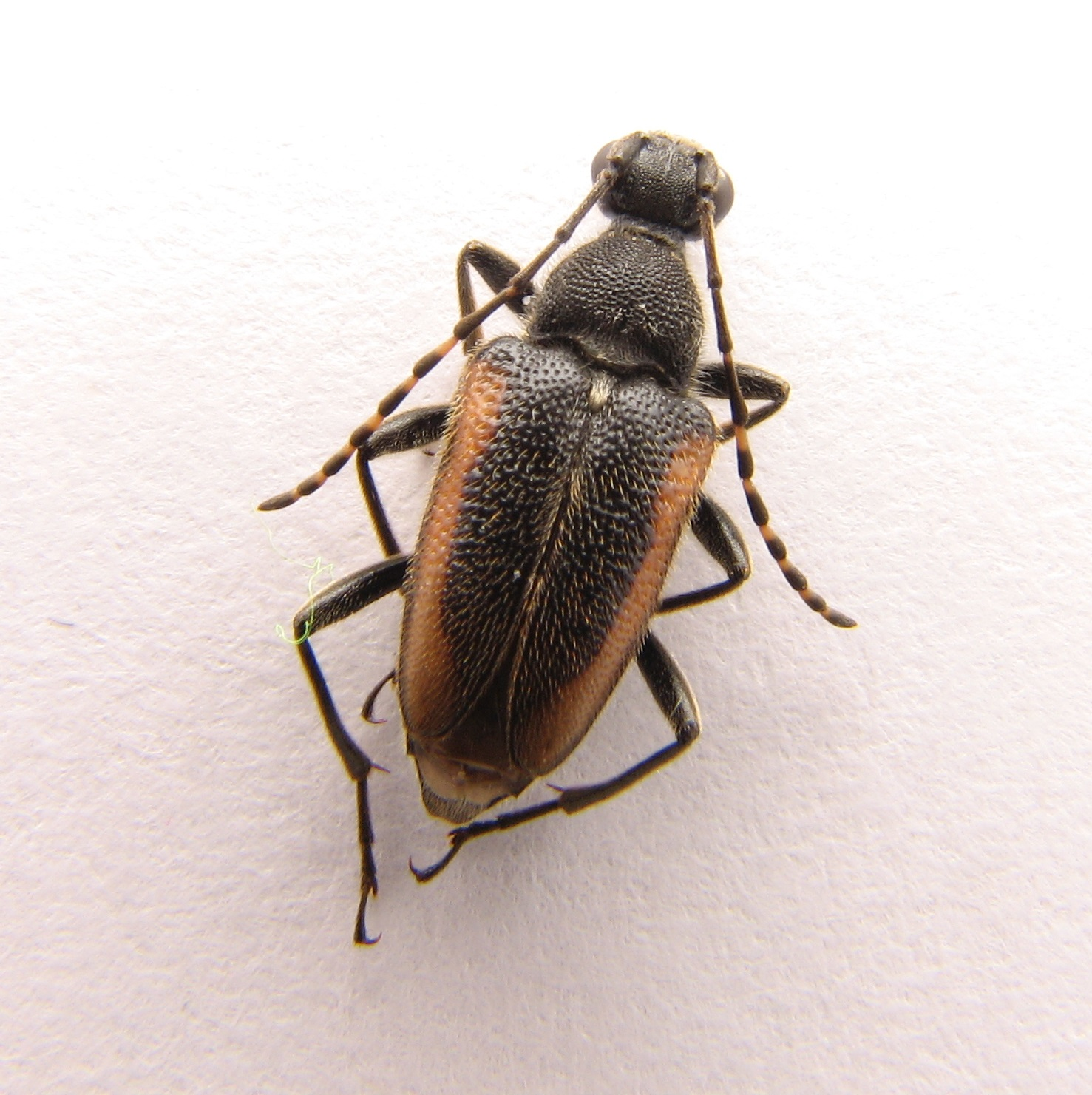

Scientific classification
- Kingdom: Animalia
- Phylum: Arthropoda
- Class: Insecta
- Order: Coleoptera
- Suborder: Polyphaga
- Infraorder: Cucujiformia
- Family: Cerambycidae
- Genus: Brachyleptura
- Species: B. champlaini

Binomial name
- Brachyleptura champlaini Casey, 1913

= Brachyleptura champlaini =

Species of beetle

Brachyleptura champlaini is a species of beetle in the family Cerambycidae. It was described by Casey in 1913.
