= Brachyleptura pernigra =

Scientific classification
- Kingdom: Animalia
- Phylum: Arthropoda
- Class: Insecta
- Order: Coleoptera
- Suborder: Polyphaga
- Infraorder: Cucujiformia
- Family: Cerambycidae
- Genus: Brachyleptura
- Species: B. pernigra

Binomial name
- Brachyleptura pernigra (Linell, 1897)

Species of beetle

Brachyleptura pernigra is a species of beetle in the family Cerambycidae. It was described by Linell in 1897.
