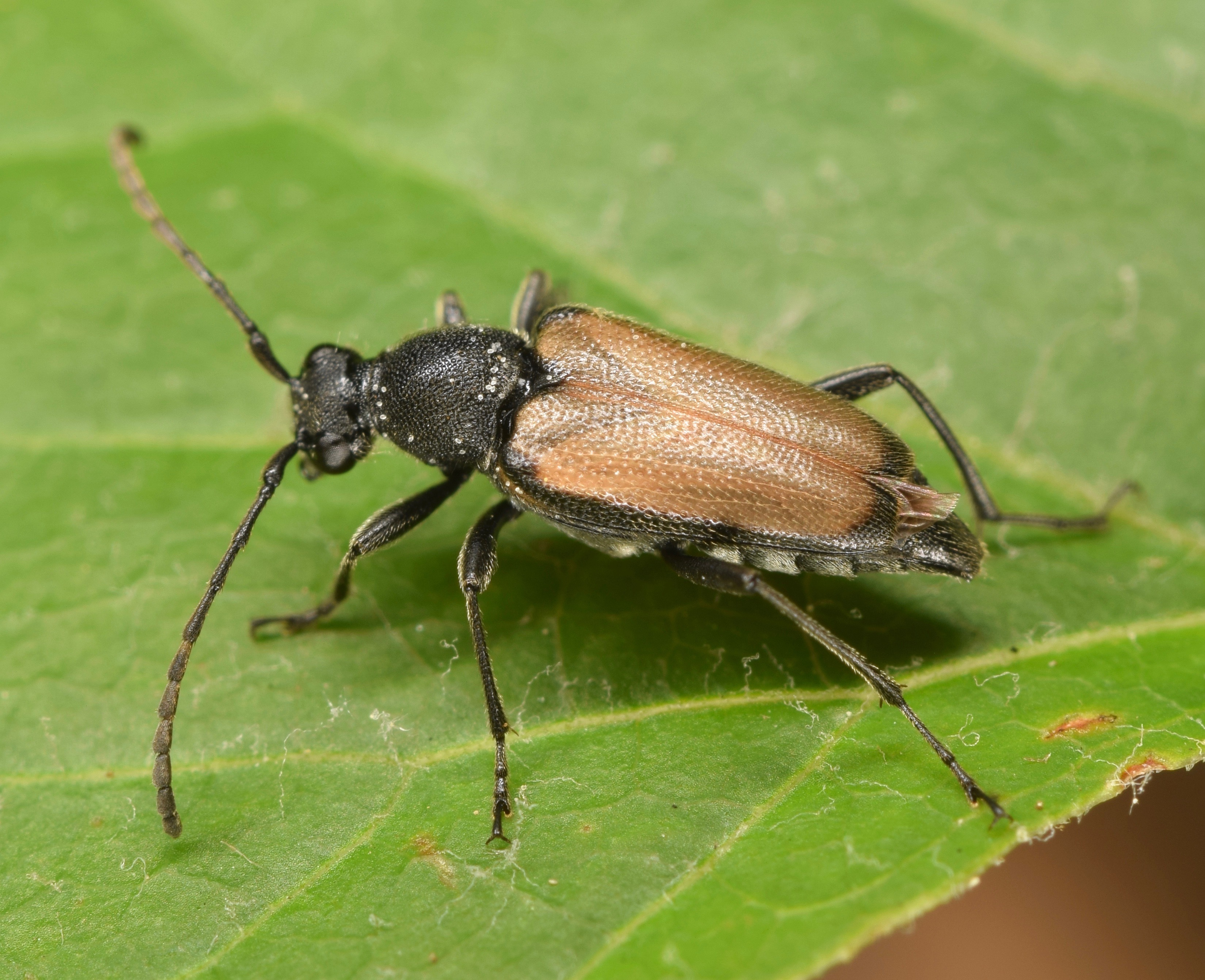

Scientific classification
- Kingdom: Animalia
- Phylum: Arthropoda
- Clade: Pancrustacea
- Class: Insecta
- Order: Coleoptera
- Suborder: Polyphaga
- Infraorder: Cucujiformia
- Family: Cerambycidae
- Genus: Brachyleptura
- Species: B. circumdata

Binomial name
- Brachyleptura circumdata (Olivier, 1795)

= Brachyleptura circumdata =

Species of beetle

Brachyleptura circumdata is a species of beetle in the family Cerambycidae. It was described by Guillaume-Antoine Olivier in 1795. The beetle is noted as being smaller than other members of its genus at 7-10mm. As larvae, they feed upon spruce and possibly pine. They are most active in June-July.
