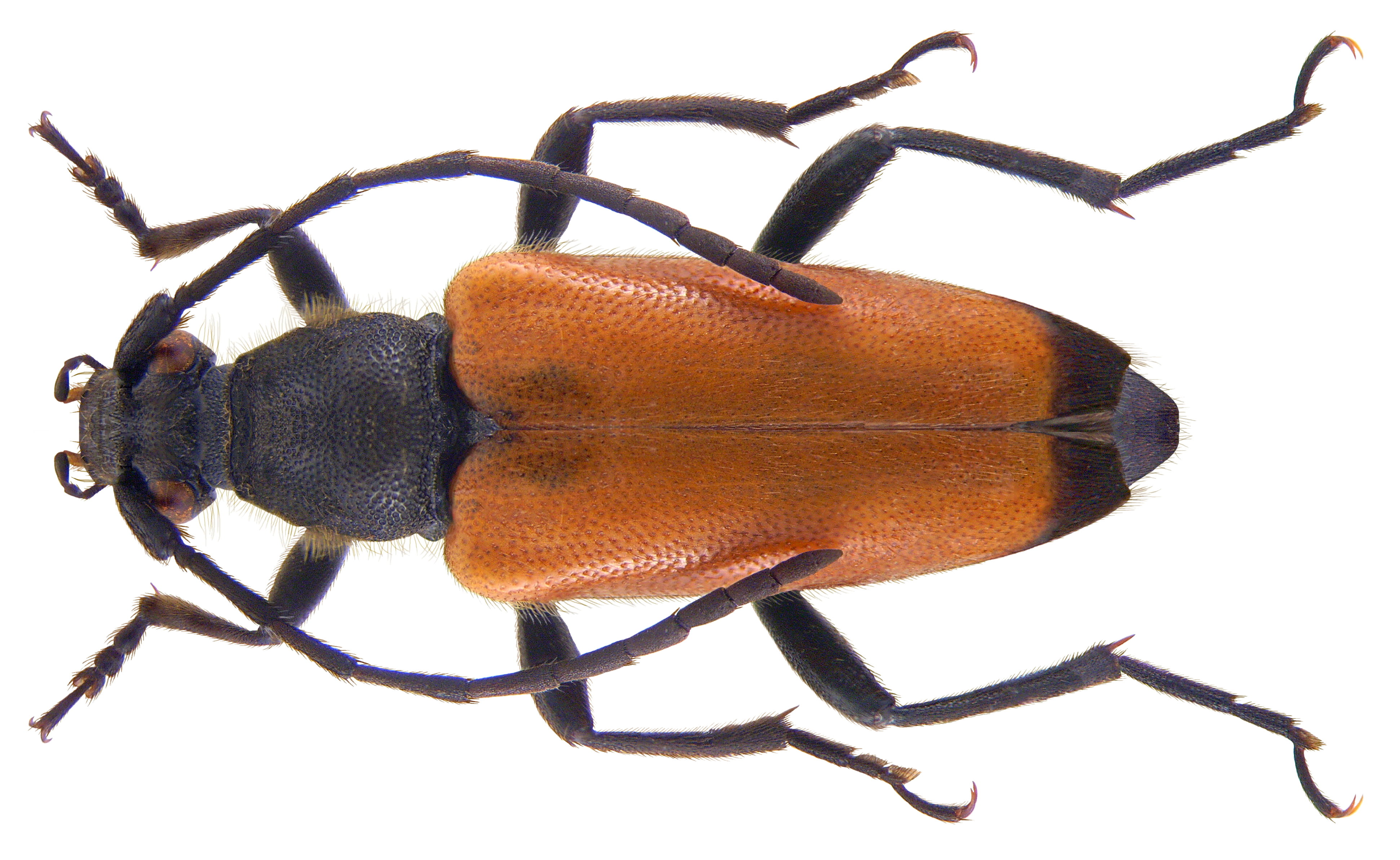

Scientific classification
- Kingdom: Animalia
- Phylum: Arthropoda
- Class: Insecta
- Order: Coleoptera
- Suborder: Polyphaga
- Infraorder: Cucujiformia
- Family: Cerambycidae
- Genus: Brachyleptura
- Species: B. fulva

Binomial name
- Brachyleptura fulva De Geer, 1775

= Brachyleptura fulva =

Species of beetle

Brachyleptura fulva is a species of longhorn beetle in the subfamily Lamiinae found in Crimea and France. The colour of the species is black, with orange wings.
