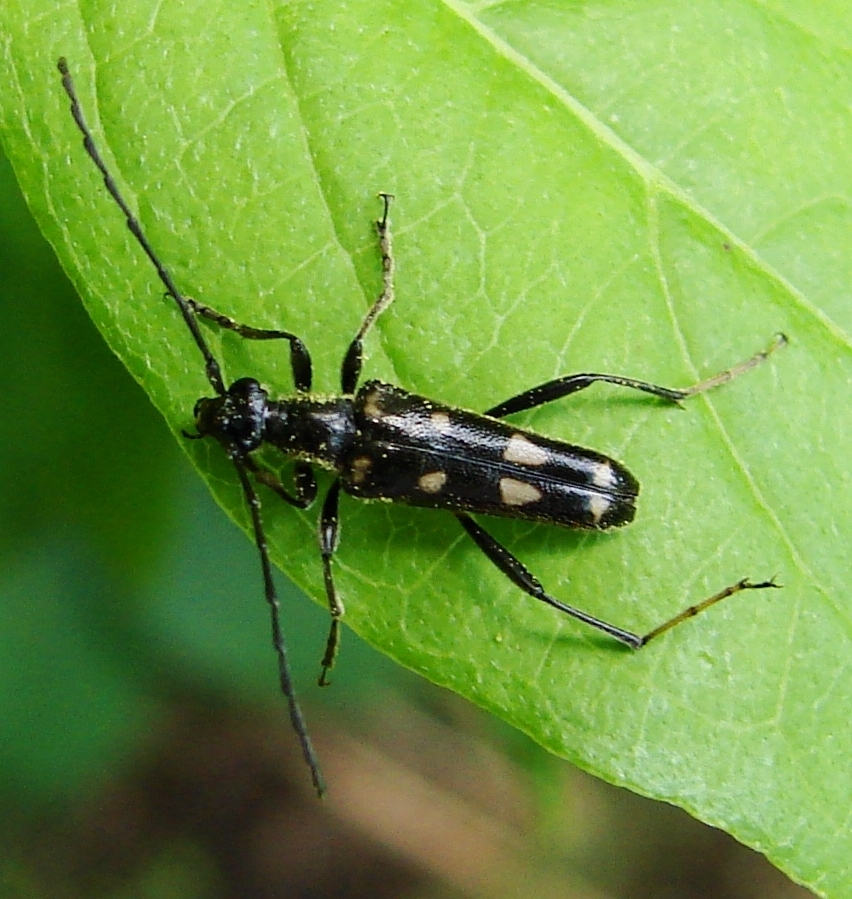

Scientific classification
- Kingdom: Animalia
- Phylum: Arthropoda
- Class: Insecta
- Order: Coleoptera
- Suborder: Polyphaga
- Infraorder: Cucujiformia
- Family: Cerambycidae
- Genus: Xestoleptura
- Species: X. octonotata

Binomial name
- Xestoleptura octonotata (Say, 1824)

Synonyms
- Xestoleptura quadripunctata (Haldeman, 1847); Xestoleptura stictica (Newman, 1841)

= Xestoleptura octonotata =

Species of beetle

Xestoleptura octonotata is a species of flower longhorn in the beetle family Cerambycidae. It is found in North America.
