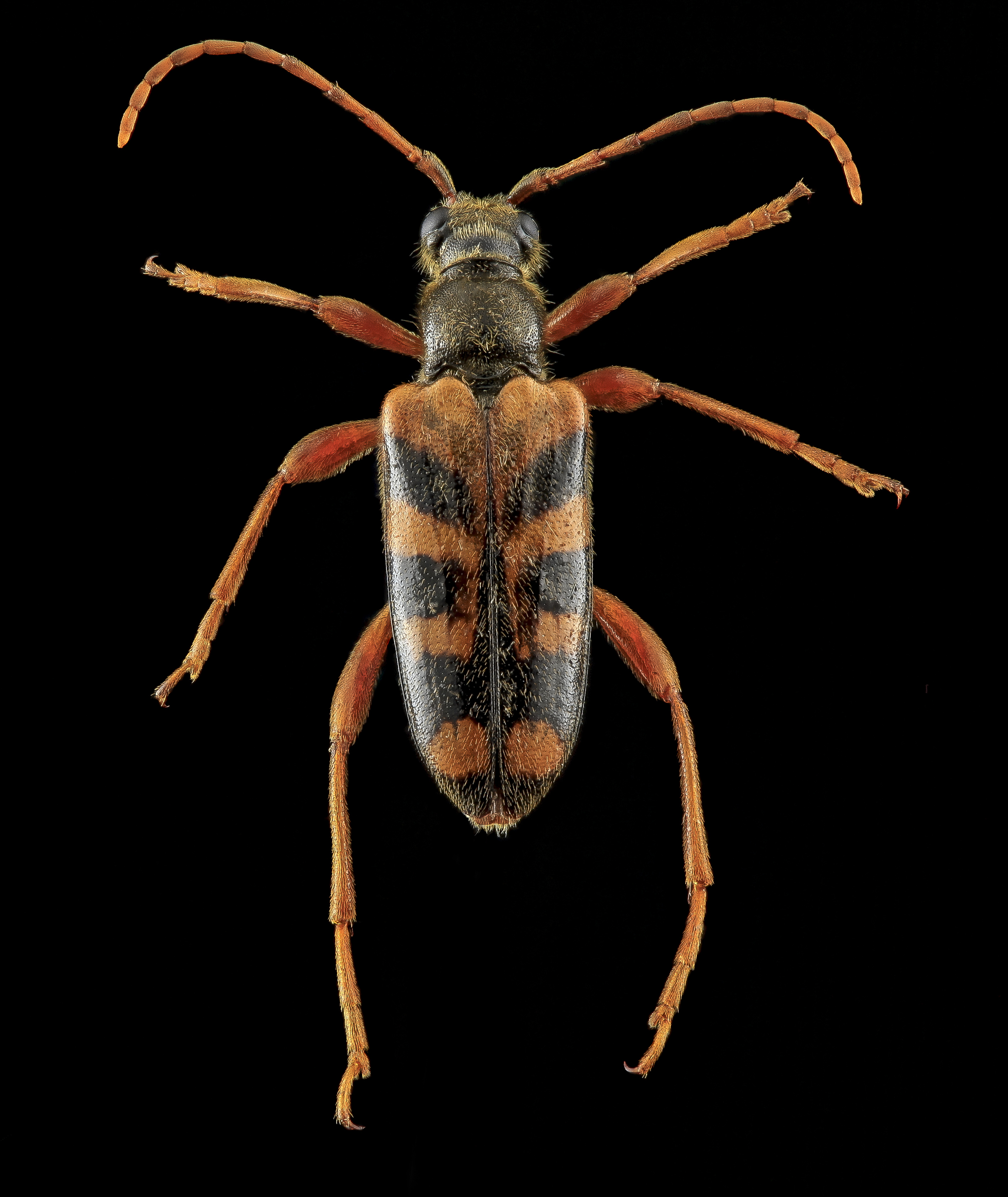

Scientific classification
- Kingdom: Animalia
- Phylum: Arthropoda
- Class: Insecta
- Order: Coleoptera
- Suborder: Polyphaga
- Infraorder: Cucujiformia
- Family: Cerambycidae
- Genus: Xestoleptura
- Species: X. crassicornis

Binomial name
- Xestoleptura crassicornis (LeConte, 1873)

Synonyms
- Leptura crassicornis LeConte 1873; Anolleptura crassicornis (LeConte 1873); Xestoleptura corusca Casey, 1913

= Xestoleptura crassicornis =

Species of beetle

Xestoleptura crassicornis is a species of flower longhorn in the beetle family Cerambycidae. It is found in western North America between California (USA) and British Columbia (Canada).

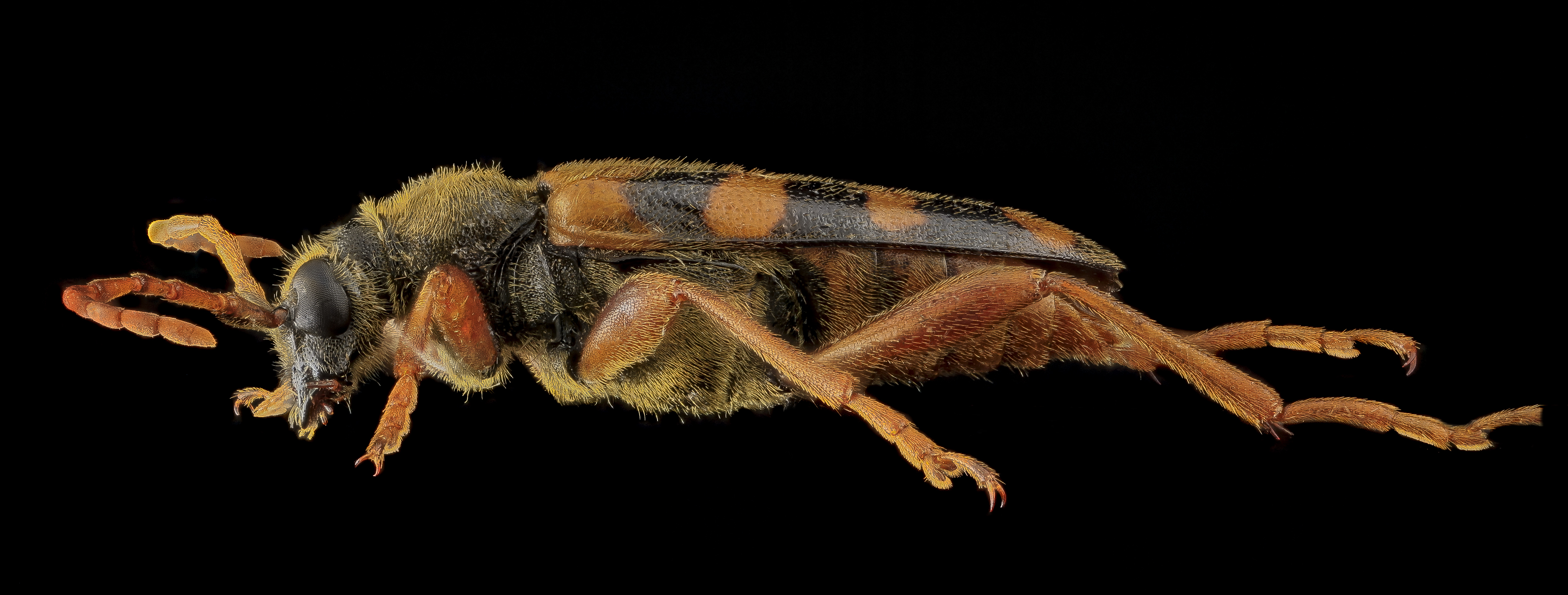

Xestoleptura crassicornis measure 10–17 mm (0.39–0.67 in) in length.
