= Xestoleptura tibialis =

Scientific classification
- Kingdom: Animalia
- Phylum: Arthropoda
- Class: Insecta
- Order: Coleoptera
- Suborder: Polyphaga
- Infraorder: Cucujiformia
- Family: Cerambycidae
- Genus: Xestoleptura
- Species: X. tibialis

Binomial name
- Xestoleptura tibialis (LeConte, 1850)

Synonyms
- Xestoleptura columbica Casey, 1913; Xestoleptura hirtella (LeConte, 1873); Xestoleptura miquelonensis (Pic, 1922); Xestoleptura pictipennis Casey, 1924

Species of beetle

Xestoleptura tibialis is a species of flower longhorn in the beetle family Cerambycidae. It is found in North America.
