= Xestoleptura behrensii =

Scientific classification
- Kingdom: Animalia
- Phylum: Arthropoda
- Class: Insecta
- Order: Coleoptera
- Suborder: Polyphaga
- Infraorder: Cucujiformia
- Family: Cerambycidae
- Genus: Xestoleptura
- Species: X. behrensii

Binomial name
- Xestoleptura behrensii (LeConte, 1873)

Synonyms
- Anoplodera behrensii Swaine & Hopping, 1928; Leptura behrensii LeConte, 1873

Species of beetle

Xestoleptura behrensii is a species of flower longhorn in the beetle family Cerambycidae.
