= Xestoleptura cockerelli =

Scientific classification
- Kingdom: Animalia
- Phylum: Arthropoda
- Class: Insecta
- Order: Coleoptera
- Suborder: Polyphaga
- Infraorder: Cucujiformia
- Family: Cerambycidae
- Genus: Xestoleptura
- Species: X. cockerelli

Binomial name
- Xestoleptura cockerelli (Fall, 1907)

Species of beetle

Xestoleptura cockerelli is a species of flower longhorn in the beetle family Cerambycidae. It is found in North America.
