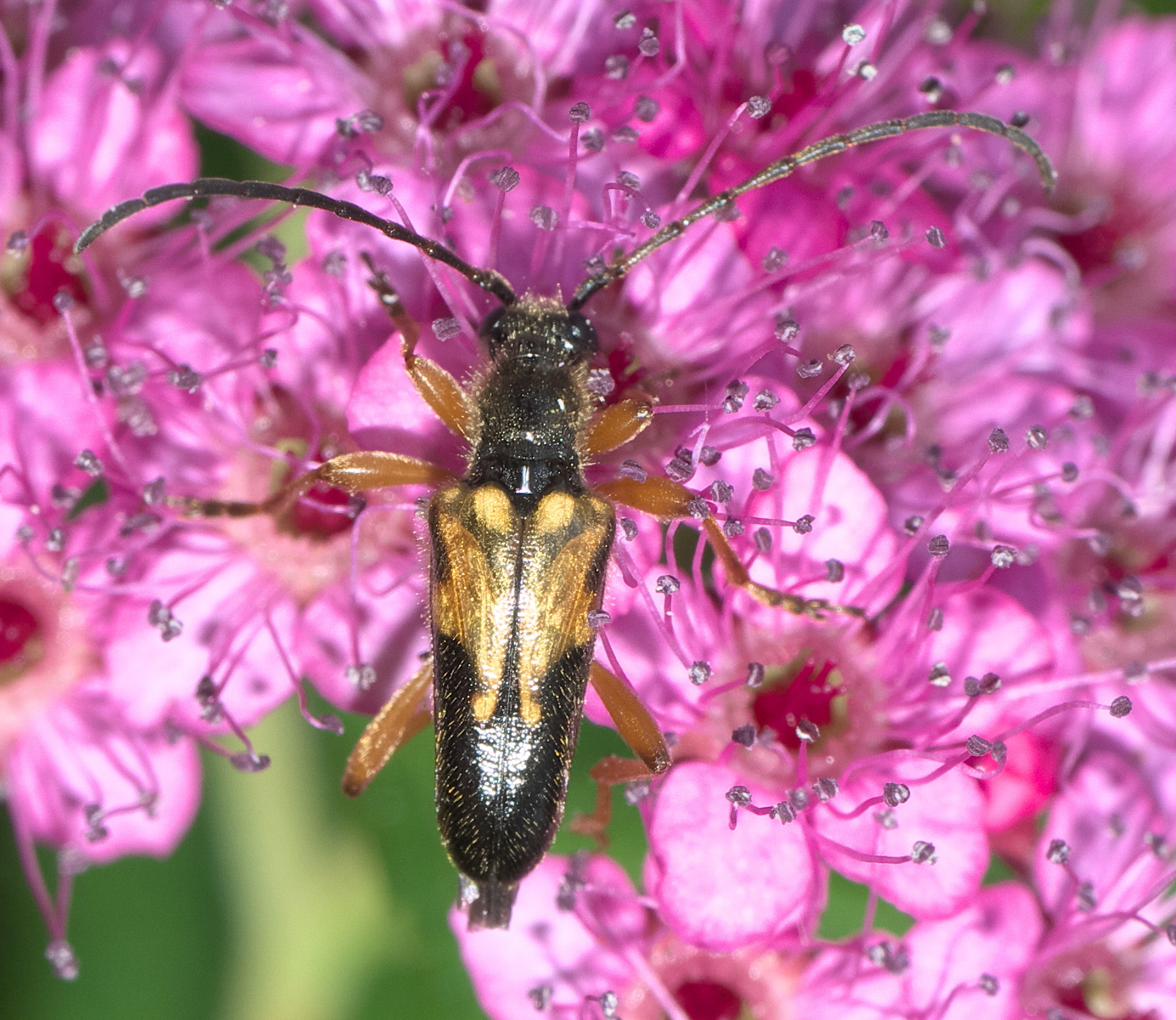

Scientific classification
- Kingdom: Animalia
- Phylum: Arthropoda
- Class: Insecta
- Order: Coleoptera
- Suborder: Polyphaga
- Infraorder: Cucujiformia
- Family: Cerambycidae
- Genus: Xestoleptura
- Species: X. crassipes

Binomial name
- Xestoleptura crassipes (LeConte, 1857)

Synonyms
- Xestoleptura crassipes shastana Casey, 1913; Xestoleptura fasciventris (LeConte, 1861); Xestoleptura muliebris Casey, 1913; Xestoleptura vancouveri Casey, 1913; Xestoleptura xanthogaster (LeConte, 1859)

= Xestoleptura crassipes =

Species of beetle

Xestoleptura crassipes is a species of flower longhorn in the beetle family Cerambycidae. It is found in North America.

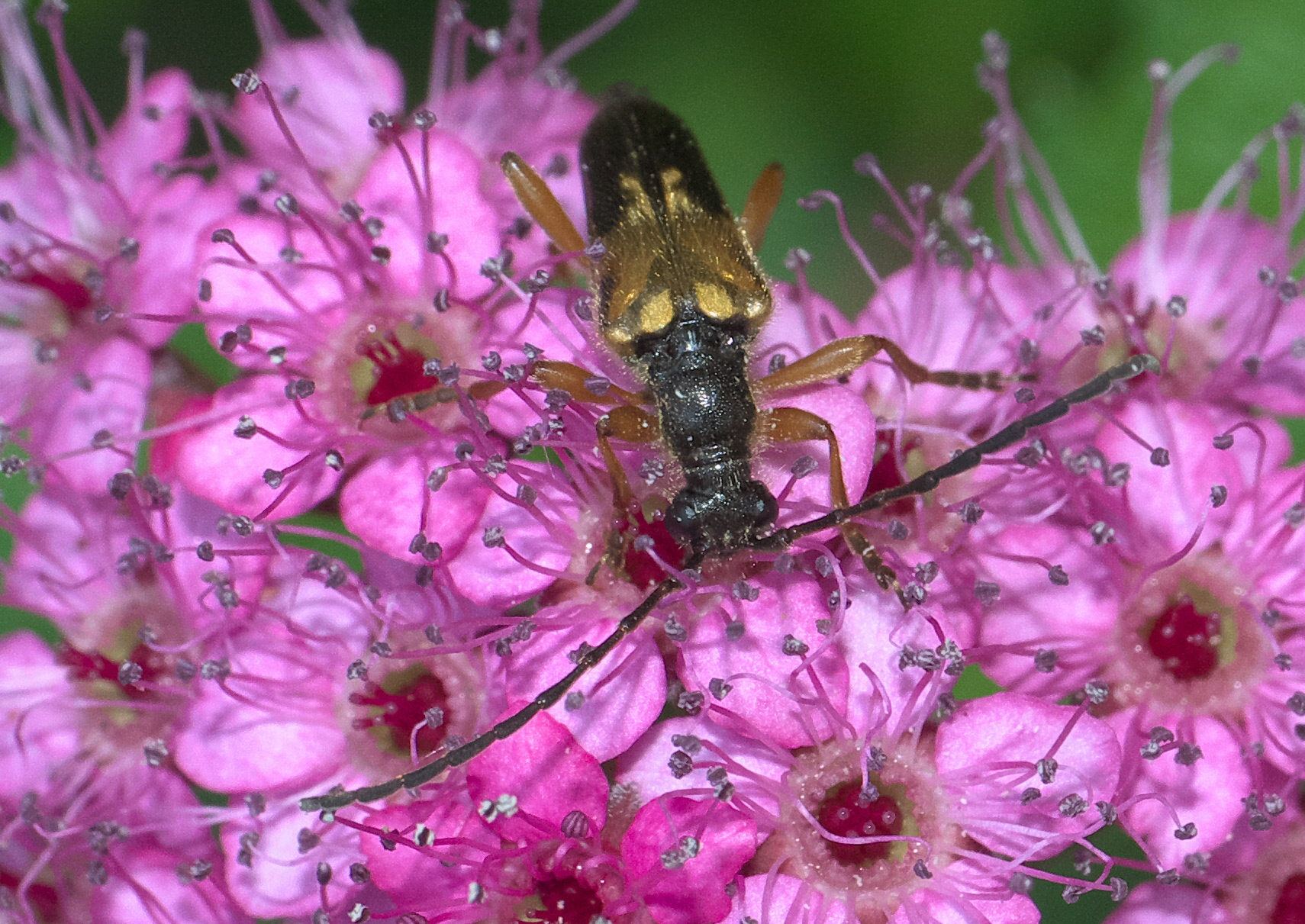
