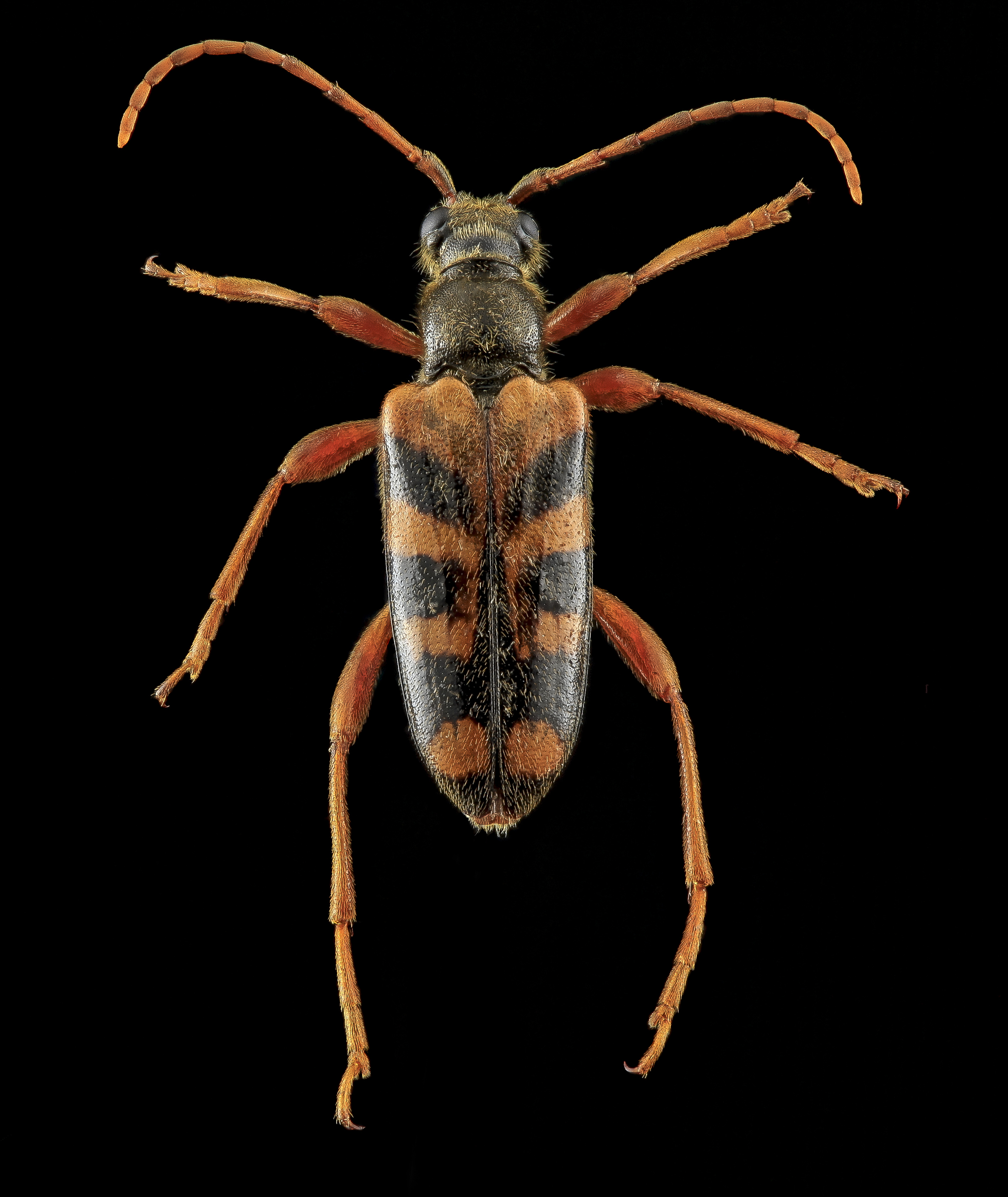
- Xestoleptura crassicornis

Scientific classification
- Kingdom: Animalia
- Phylum: Arthropoda
- Class: Insecta
- Order: Coleoptera
- Suborder: Polyphaga
- Infraorder: Cucujiformia
- Family: Cerambycidae
- Tribe: Lepturini
- Genus: Xestoleptura

= Xestoleptura =

Genus of beetles

Xestoleptura is a genus of flower longhorn beetles in the family Cerambycidae.

== Species ==
These 10 species belong to the genus Xestoleptura:

- Xestoleptura baeckmanni (Plavilstshikov, 1936)^{c g}
- Xestoleptura behrensi (LeConte, 1873)^{i b}
- Xestoleptura behrensii (LeConte, 1873)^{c g}
- Xestoleptura cockerelli (Fall, 1907)^{i c g b}
- Xestoleptura crassicornis (LeConte, 1873)^{i c g b}
- Xestoleptura crassipes (LeConte, 1857)^{i c g b}
- Xestoleptura nigroflava (Fuss, 1852)^{c g}
- Xestoleptura octonotata (Say, 1824)^{i c g b}
- Xestoleptura rufiventris (Gebler, 1830)^{c g}
- Xestoleptura tibialis (LeConte, 1850)^{i c g b}

Data sources: i = ITIS, c = Catalogue of Life, g = GBIF, b = Bugguide.net
