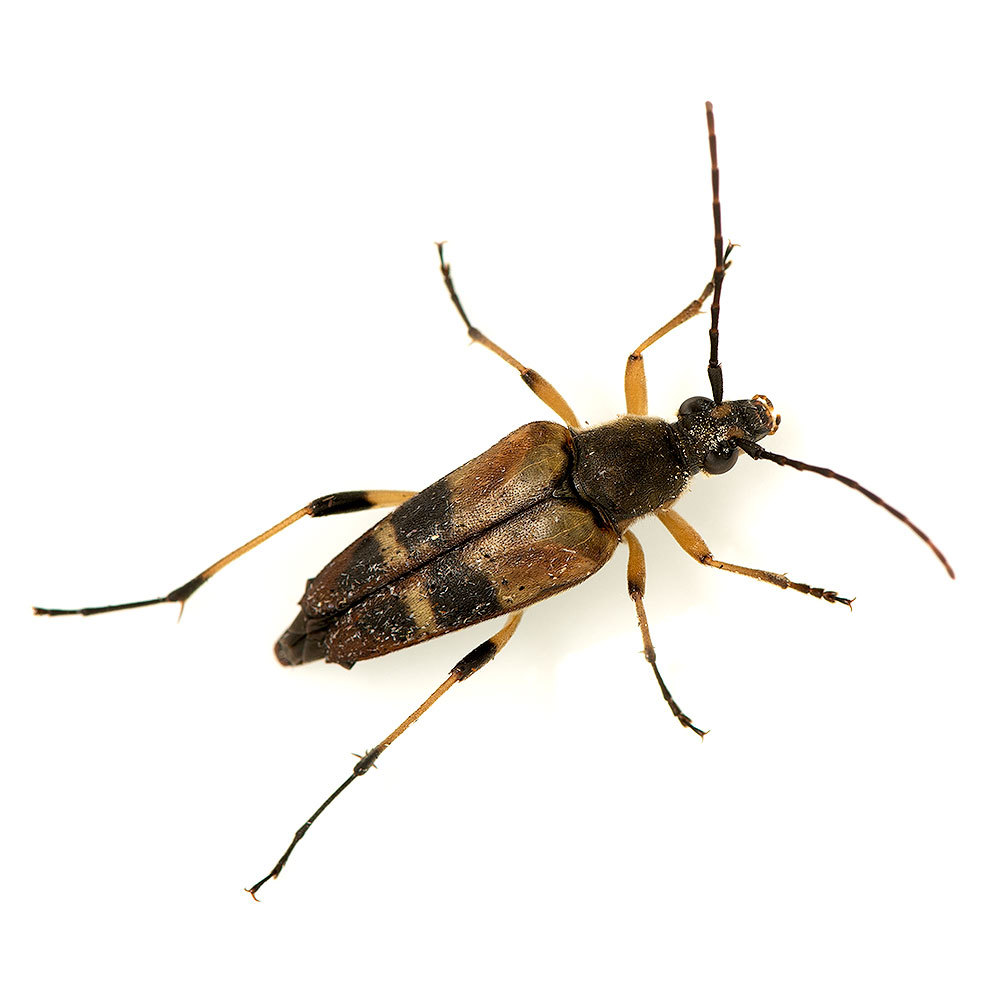
- Etorofus obliteratus

Scientific classification
- Domain: Eukaryota
- Kingdom: Animalia
- Phylum: Arthropoda
- Class: Insecta
- Order: Coleoptera
- Suborder: Polyphaga
- Infraorder: Cucujiformia
- Family: Cerambycidae
- Tribe: Lepturini
- Genus: Etorofus; Matsushita 1933

= Etorofus =

Genus of beetles

Etorofus is a genus of beetles in the family Cerambycidae, containing the following species:

- Etorofus anthracinus (LeConte, 1875)
- Etorofus deletus (LeConte, 1850)
- Etorofus nemurensis Matsushita 1933
- Etorofus obliteratus (Haldeman, 1847)
- Etorofus plagiferus (LeConte, 1873)
- Etorofus plebejus (Randall, 1838)
- Etorofus propinquus (Bland, 1865)
- Etorofus pubescens (Fabricius, 1787)
- Etorofus soror (LeConte, 1873)
- Etorofus subhamatus (Randall, 1838)
- Etorofus vitiosus (LeConte, 1854)'.
