= Etorofus plagiferus =

Scientific classification
- Domain: Eukaryota
- Kingdom: Animalia
- Phylum: Arthropoda
- Class: Insecta
- Order: Coleoptera
- Suborder: Polyphaga
- Infraorder: Cucujiformia
- Family: Cerambycidae
- Genus: Etorofus
- Species: E. plagiferus

Binomial name
- Etorofus plagiferus (LeConte, 1873)

Synonyms
- Leptura plagifera LeConte, 1873

Species of beetle

Etorofus plagiferus is a species of beetle in the family Cerambycidae. It was first described by John Lawrence LeConte in 1873.
