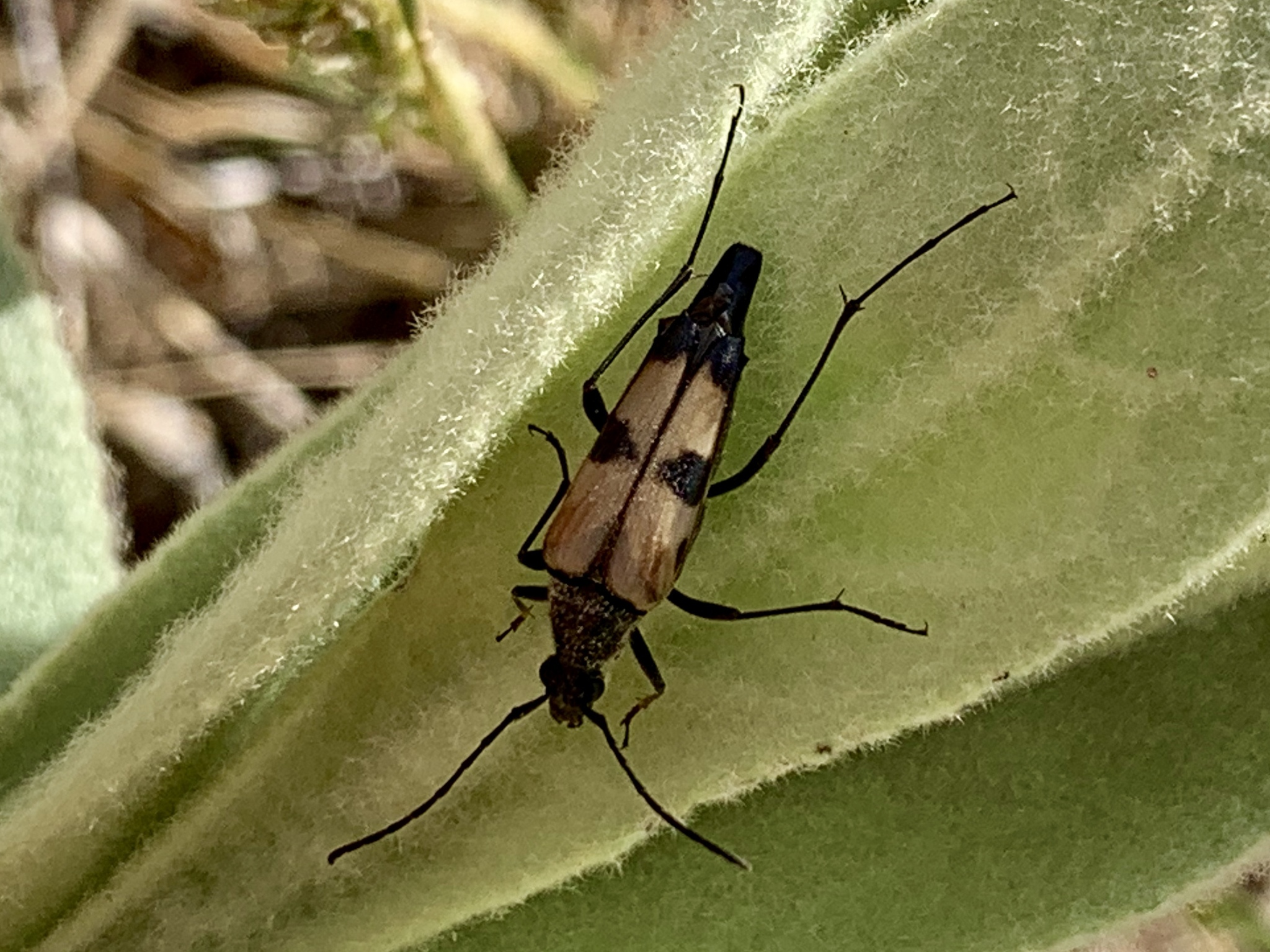

Scientific classification
- Domain: Eukaryota
- Kingdom: Animalia
- Phylum: Arthropoda
- Class: Insecta
- Order: Coleoptera
- Suborder: Polyphaga
- Infraorder: Cucujiformia
- Family: Cerambycidae
- Genus: Etorofus
- Species: E. propinquus

Binomial name
- Etorofus propinquus (Bland, 1865)

Synonyms
- Leptura propinqua Bland, 1865

= Etorofus propinquus =

Species of beetle

Etorofus propinquus is a species of beetle in the family Cerambycidae. It was described by Bland in 1865.
