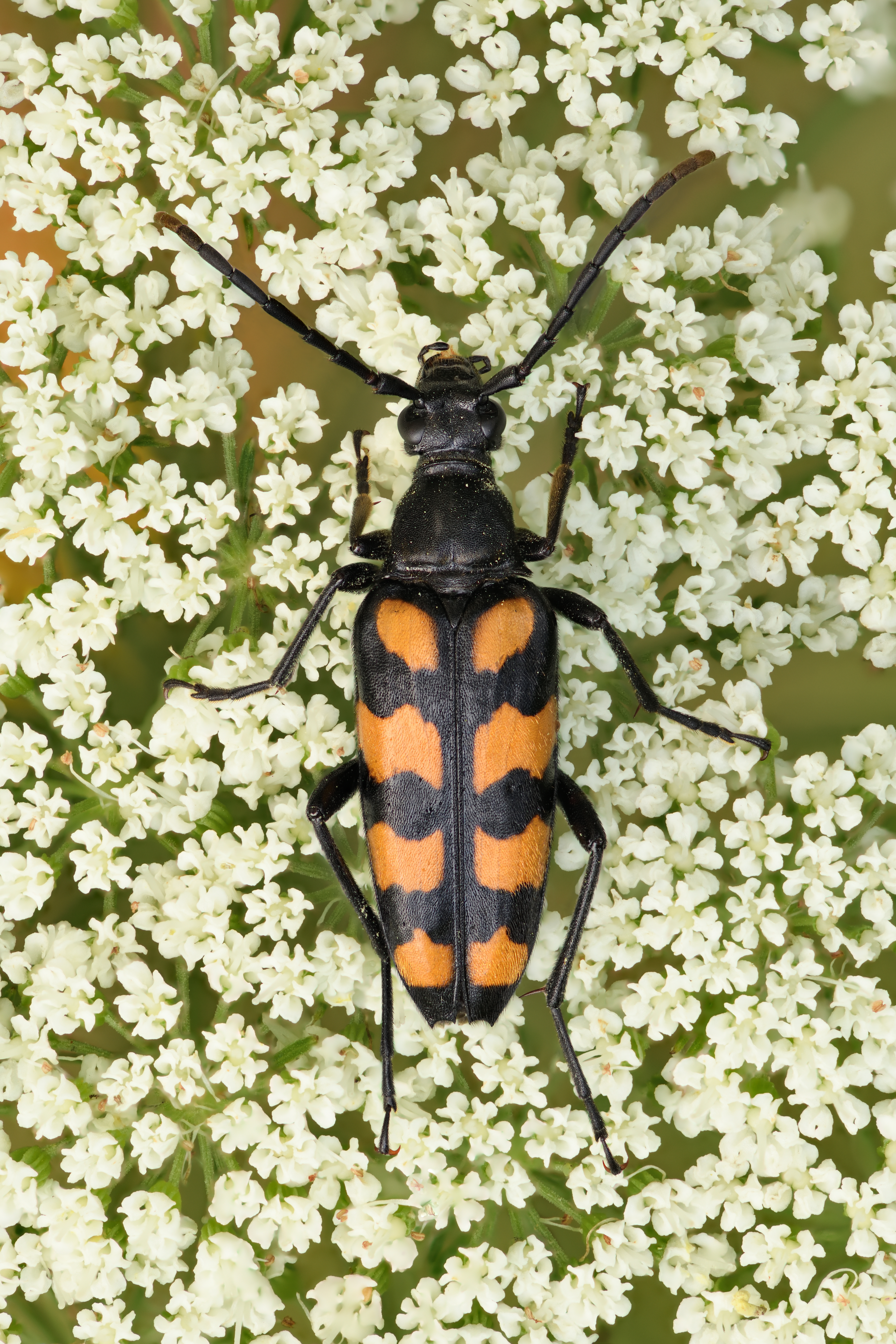

Scientific classification
- Kingdom: Animalia
- Phylum: Arthropoda
- Clade: Pancrustacea
- Class: Insecta
- Order: Coleoptera
- Suborder: Polyphaga
- Infraorder: Cucujiformia
- Family: Cerambycidae
- Genus: Etorofus
- Species: E. plebejus

Binomial name
- Etorofus plebejus (Randall, 1838)

Synonyms
- Leptura plebeja Randall, 1838

= Etorofus plebejus =

Species of beetle

Etorofus plebejus is a species of beetle in the family Cerambycidae. It was described by Randall in 1838.
