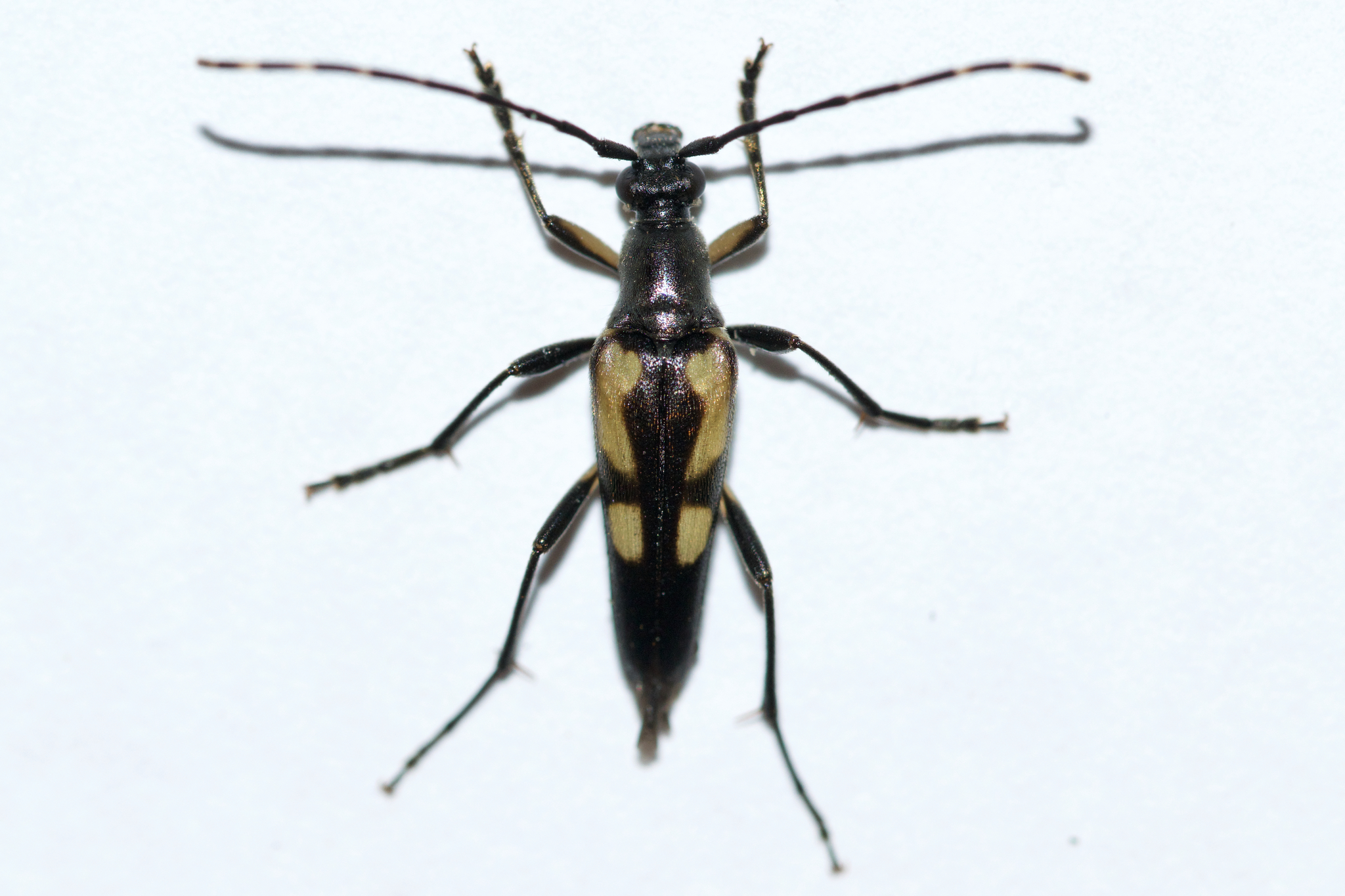

Scientific classification
- Domain: Eukaryota
- Kingdom: Animalia
- Phylum: Arthropoda
- Class: Insecta
- Order: Coleoptera
- Suborder: Polyphaga
- Infraorder: Cucujiformia
- Family: Cerambycidae
- Genus: Etorofus
- Species: E. subhamatus

Binomial name
- Etorofus subhamatus (Randall, 1838)

Synonyms
- Leptura subhamata Randall, 1838

= Etorofus subhamatus =

Species of beetle

Etorofus subhamatus is a species of beetle in the family Cerambycidae. It was described by Randall in 1838.
