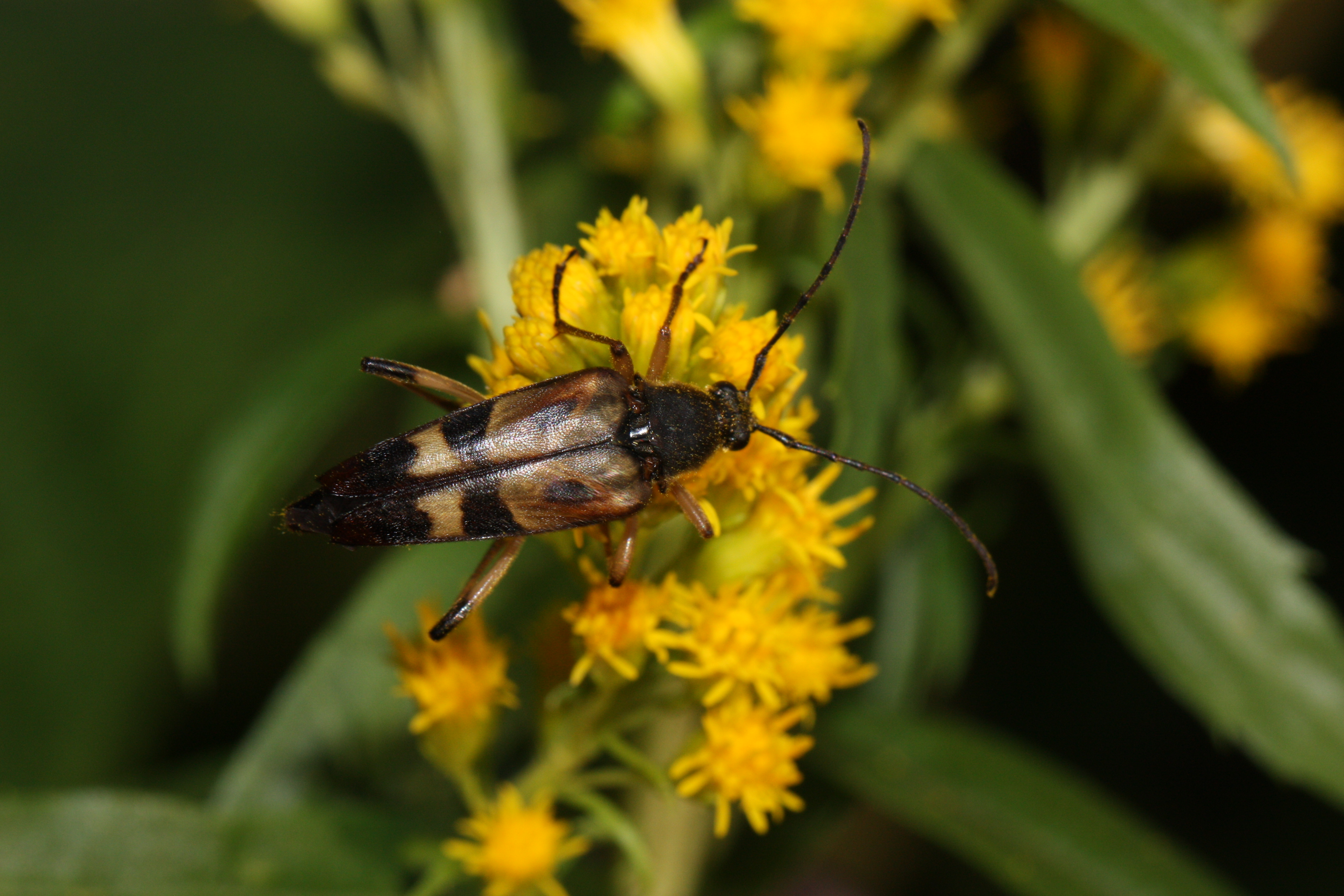

Scientific classification
- Domain: Eukaryota
- Kingdom: Animalia
- Phylum: Arthropoda
- Class: Insecta
- Order: Coleoptera
- Suborder: Polyphaga
- Infraorder: Cucujiformia
- Family: Cerambycidae
- Genus: Etorofus
- Species: E. obliteratus

Binomial name
- Etorofus obliteratus (Haldeman, 1847)

Synonyms
- Leptura obliterata (Haldeman, 1847); Leptura idahoensis Casey 1913; Leptura perductora Walker in Lord 1866

= Etorofus obliteratus =

Species of beetle

Etorofus obliteratus is a species of beetle in the family Cerambycidae. It was described by Haldeman in 1847.
