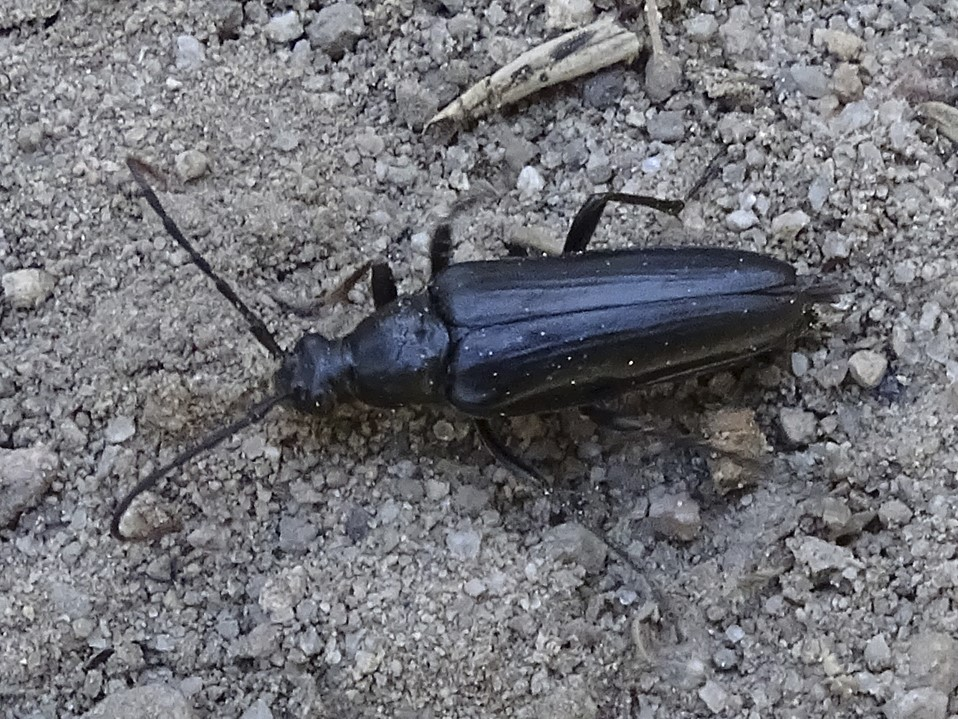

Scientific classification
- Domain: Eukaryota
- Kingdom: Animalia
- Phylum: Arthropoda
- Class: Insecta
- Order: Coleoptera
- Suborder: Polyphaga
- Infraorder: Cucujiformia
- Family: Cerambycidae
- Genus: Etorofus
- Species: E. anthracinus

Binomial name
- Etorofus anthracinus (LeConte, 1875)

Synonyms
- Leptura anthracina LeConte, 1875

= Etorofus anthracinus =

Species of beetle

Etorofus anthracinus is a species of beetle in the family Cerambycidae. It was first described by John Lawrence LeConte in 1875. They are found in North America and can be observed seeking the dead parts of living trees for development.
