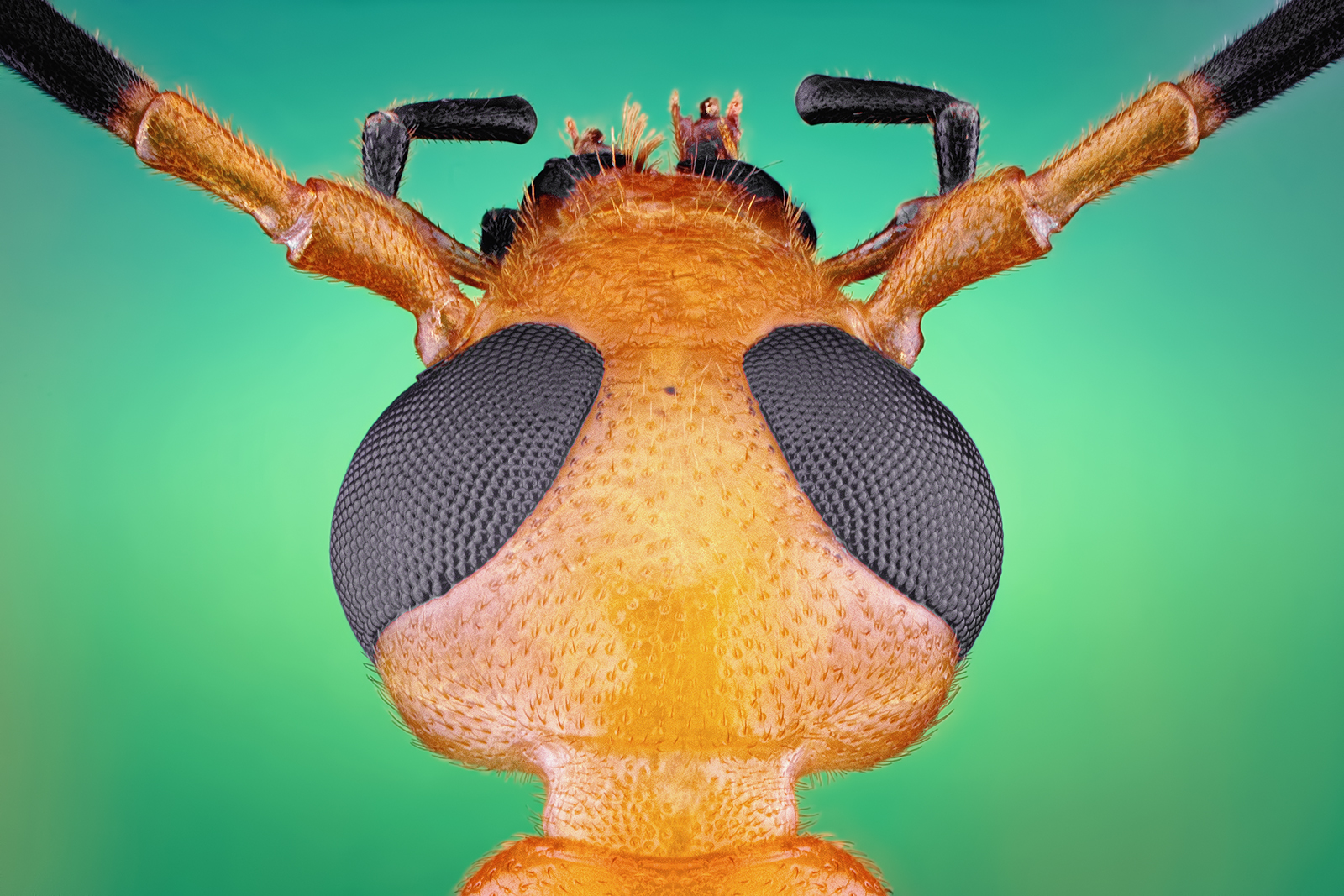
- Centrodera spurca

Scientific classification
- Kingdom: Animalia
- Phylum: Arthropoda
- Class: Insecta
- Order: Coleoptera
- Suborder: Polyphaga
- Infraorder: Cucujiformia
- Family: Cerambycidae
- Subfamily: Lepturinae
- Tribe: Rhagiini
- Genus: Centrodera; LeConte, 1850

Synonyms
- Centrodera (Apatophysis) Gressit, 1947; Parapachyta Casey, 1913; Rhamnusium Haldeman, 1847

= Centrodera =

Species of beetle

Centrodera is the genus of the Lepturinae subfamily in long-horned beetle family. Beetles of this genus are distributed in North America, most of them are found only in United States.

== Species list ==
Species include:

- Centrodera autumnata Leech, 1963
- Centrodera dayi Leech, 1963
- Centrodera decolorata (Harris, 1841)
- Centrodera minima Linsley & Chemsak, 1972
- Centrodera nevadica LeConte, 1873
- Centrodera oculata Casey, 1913
- Centrodera osburni Knull, 1947
- Centrodera quadrimaculata (Champlain & Knull, 1922)
- Centrodera spurca (LeConte, 1857)
- Centrodera sublineata LeConte, 1862
- Centrodera tenera Casey, 1913
