= Centrodera autumnata =

Scientific classification
- Kingdom: Animalia
- Phylum: Arthropoda
- Class: Insecta
- Order: Coleoptera
- Suborder: Polyphaga
- Infraorder: Cucujiformia
- Family: Cerambycidae
- Genus: Centrodera
- Species: C. autumnata

Binomial name
- Centrodera autumnata Leech, 1963

Species of beetle

Centrodera autumnata is a species of flower longhorn in the family Cerambycidae. It is found in North America.
