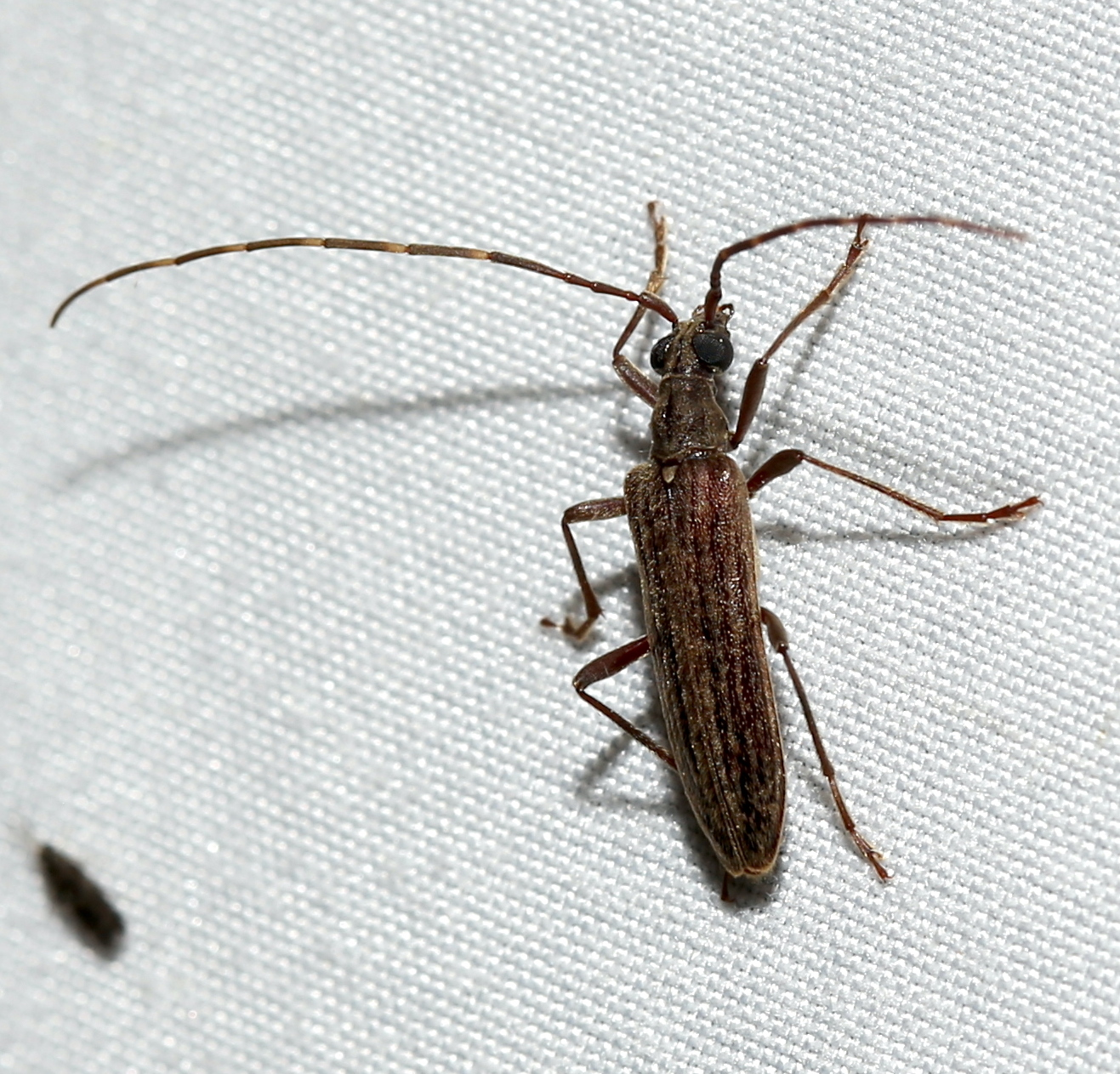

Scientific classification
- Kingdom: Animalia
- Phylum: Arthropoda
- Class: Insecta
- Order: Coleoptera
- Suborder: Polyphaga
- Infraorder: Cucujiformia
- Family: Cerambycidae
- Tribe: Rhagiini
- Genus: Centrodera
- Species: C. sublineata

Binomial name
- Centrodera sublineata LeConte, 1862

= Centrodera sublineata =

Species of beetle

Centrodera sublineata is a species of flower longhorn in the beetle family Cerambycidae. It is found in North America.
