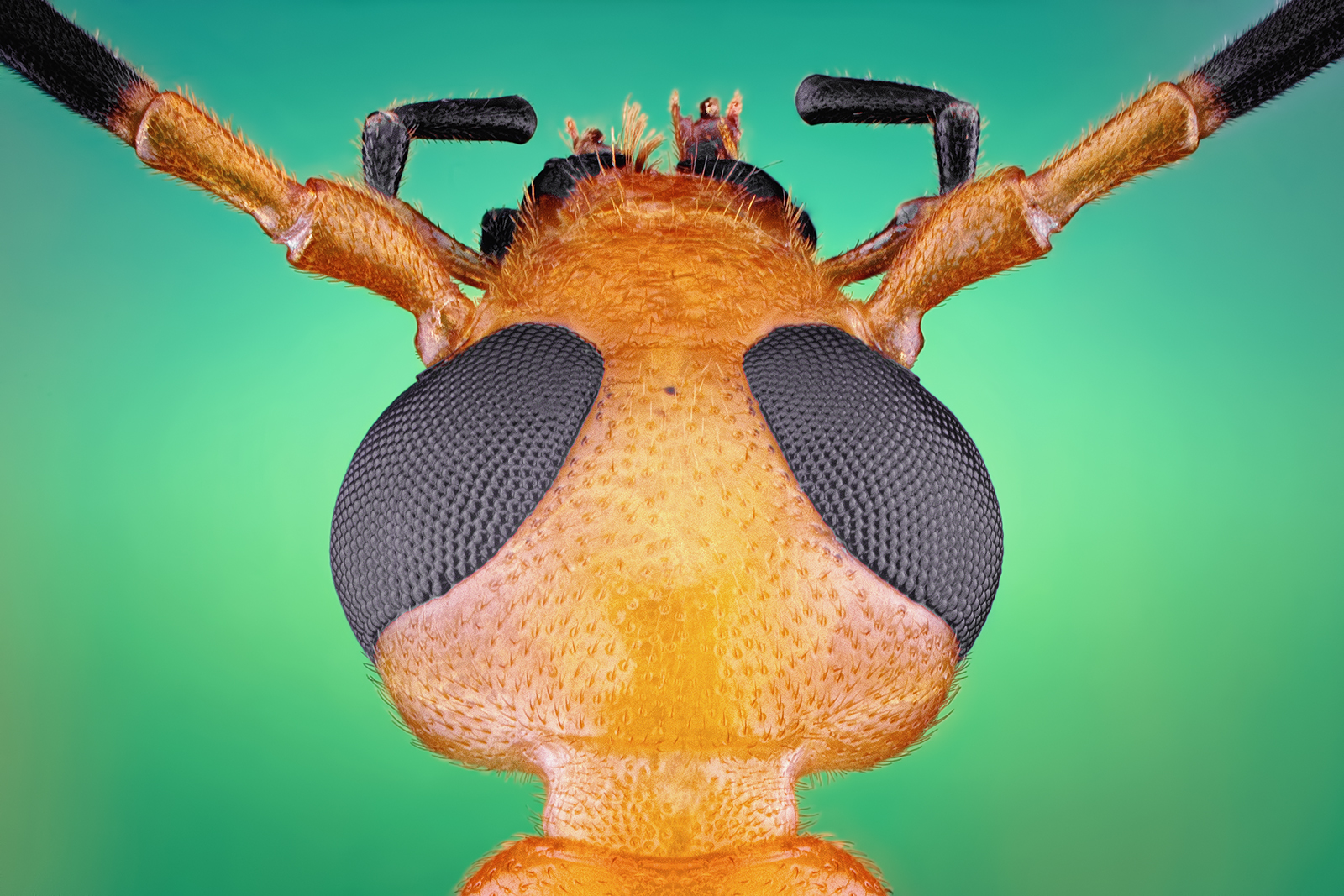

Scientific classification
- Domain: Eukaryota
- Kingdom: Animalia
- Phylum: Arthropoda
- Class: Insecta
- Order: Coleoptera
- Suborder: Polyphaga
- Infraorder: Cucujiformia
- Family: Cerambycidae
- Tribe: Lepturini
- Genus: Centrodera
- Species: C. spurca

Binomial name
- Centrodera spurca (LeConte, 1857)

Synonyms
- Centrodera cervinus (Walker, 1866)

= Centrodera spurca =

Species of beetle

Centrodera spurca, the yellow Douglas fir borer, is a species of flower longhorn in the beetle family Cerambycidae. It is found in North America.
