= Centrodera tenera =

Scientific classification
- Kingdom: Animalia
- Phylum: Arthropoda
- Class: Insecta
- Order: Coleoptera
- Suborder: Polyphaga
- Infraorder: Cucujiformia
- Family: Cerambycidae
- Tribe: Rhagiini
- Genus: Centrodera
- Species: C. tenera

Binomial name
- Centrodera tenera Casey, 1913

Synonyms
- Centrodera pilosa Van Dyke, 1927

Species of beetle

Centrodera tenera is a species of flower longhorn in the beetle family Cerambycidae. It is found in North America.
