= Centrodera oculata =

Scientific classification
- Kingdom: Animalia
- Phylum: Arthropoda
- Class: Insecta
- Order: Coleoptera
- Suborder: Polyphaga
- Infraorder: Cucujiformia
- Family: Cerambycidae
- Tribe: Rhagiini
- Genus: Centrodera
- Species: C. oculata

Binomial name
- Centrodera oculata Casey, 1913

Species of beetle

Centrodera oculata is a species of flower longhorn in the beetle family Cerambycidae. It is found in North America.

== Subspecies ==
These two subspecies belong to the species Centrodera oculata:

- Centrodera oculata blaisdelli Van Dyke, 1927
- Centrodera oculata oculata Casey, 1913
