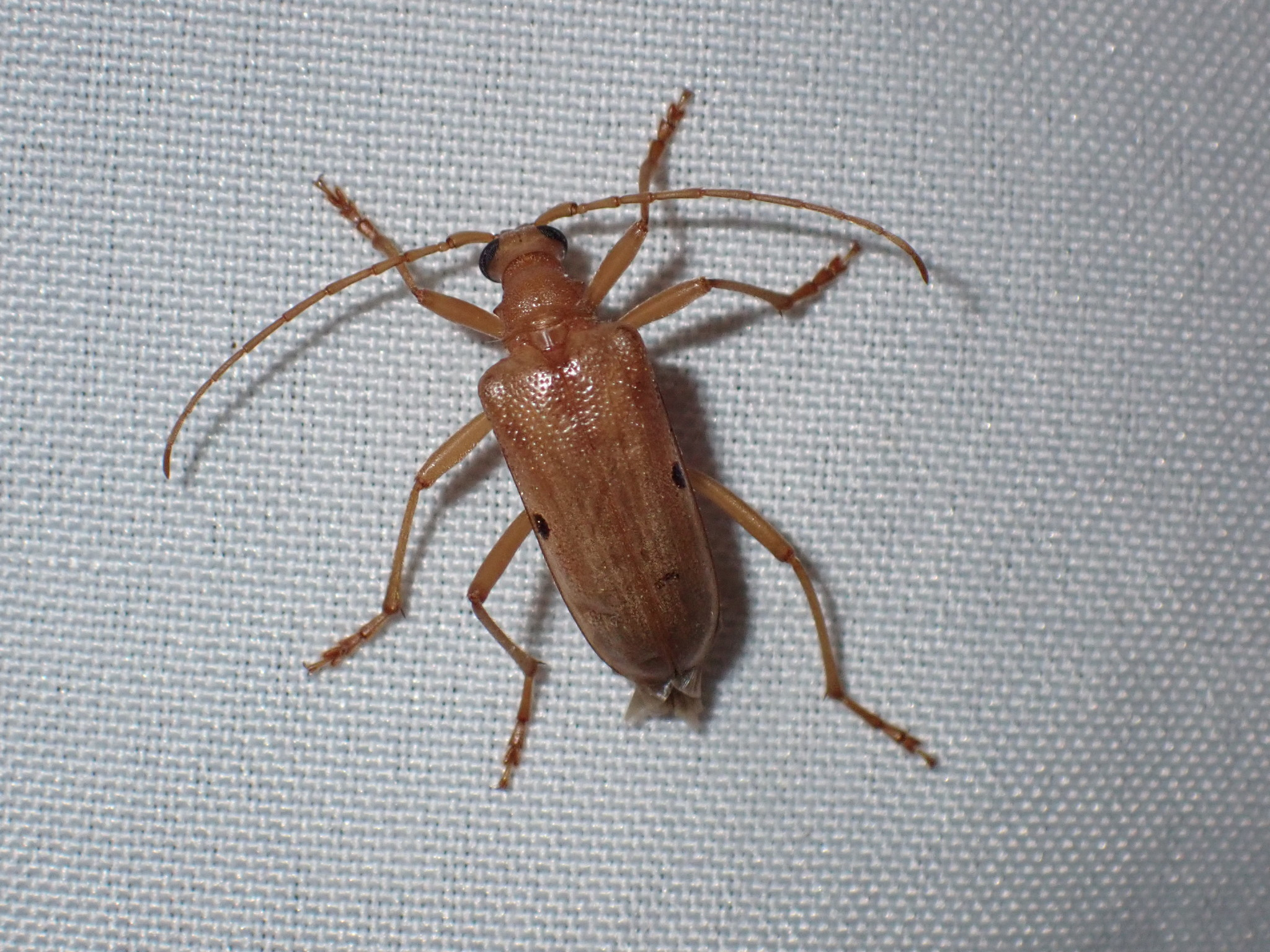

Scientific classification
- Kingdom: Animalia
- Phylum: Arthropoda
- Class: Insecta
- Order: Coleoptera
- Suborder: Polyphaga
- Infraorder: Cucujiformia
- Family: Cerambycidae
- Genus: Centrodera
- Species: C. dayi

Binomial name
- Centrodera dayi Leech, 1963

= Centrodera dayi =

Species of beetle

Centrodera dayi is a species of long-horned beetle in the family Cerambycidae. It is found in North America.
