= Centrodera decolorata =

Scientific classification
- Domain: Eukaryota
- Kingdom: Animalia
- Phylum: Arthropoda
- Class: Insecta
- Order: Coleoptera
- Suborder: Polyphaga
- Infraorder: Cucujiformia
- Family: Cerambycidae
- Genus: Centrodera
- Species: C. decolorata

Binomial name
- Centrodera decolorata (Harris, 1841)

Synonyms
- Centrodera decolorata lacustris (Haldeman, 1847); Centrodera rubidus Casey, 1918

Species of beetle

Centrodera decolorata is a species of flower longhorn in the family Cerambycidae. It is found in North America.
