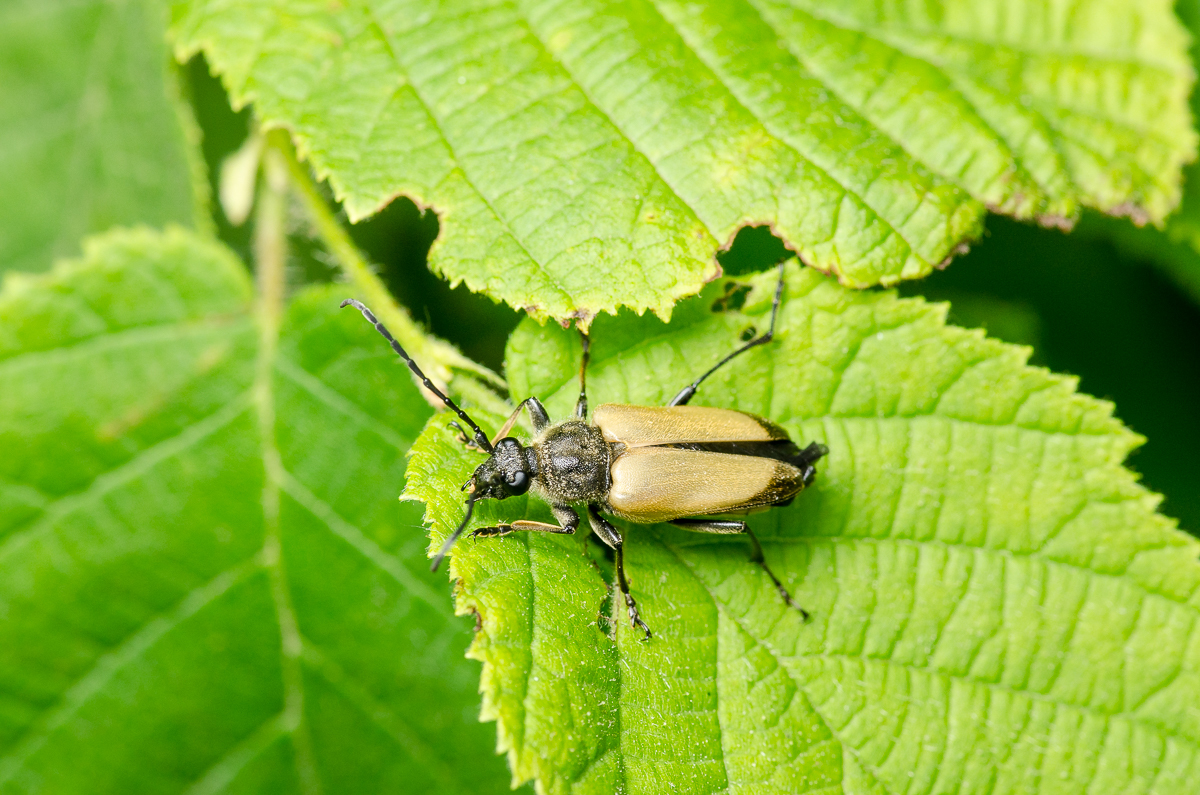

Scientific classification
- Domain: Eukaryota
- Kingdom: Animalia
- Phylum: Arthropoda
- Class: Insecta
- Order: Coleoptera
- Suborder: Polyphaga
- Infraorder: Cucujiformia
- Family: Cerambycidae
- Genus: Trigonarthris
- Species: T. proxima

Binomial name
- Trigonarthris proxima (Say, 1824)

Synonyms
- Trigonarthris kempiana (Casey, 1924); Trigonarthris subpubescens (Kirby in Richardson, 1837)

= Trigonarthris proxima =

Species of beetle

Trigonarthris proxima is a species of flower longhorn in the beetle family Cerambycidae. It is found in North America.
