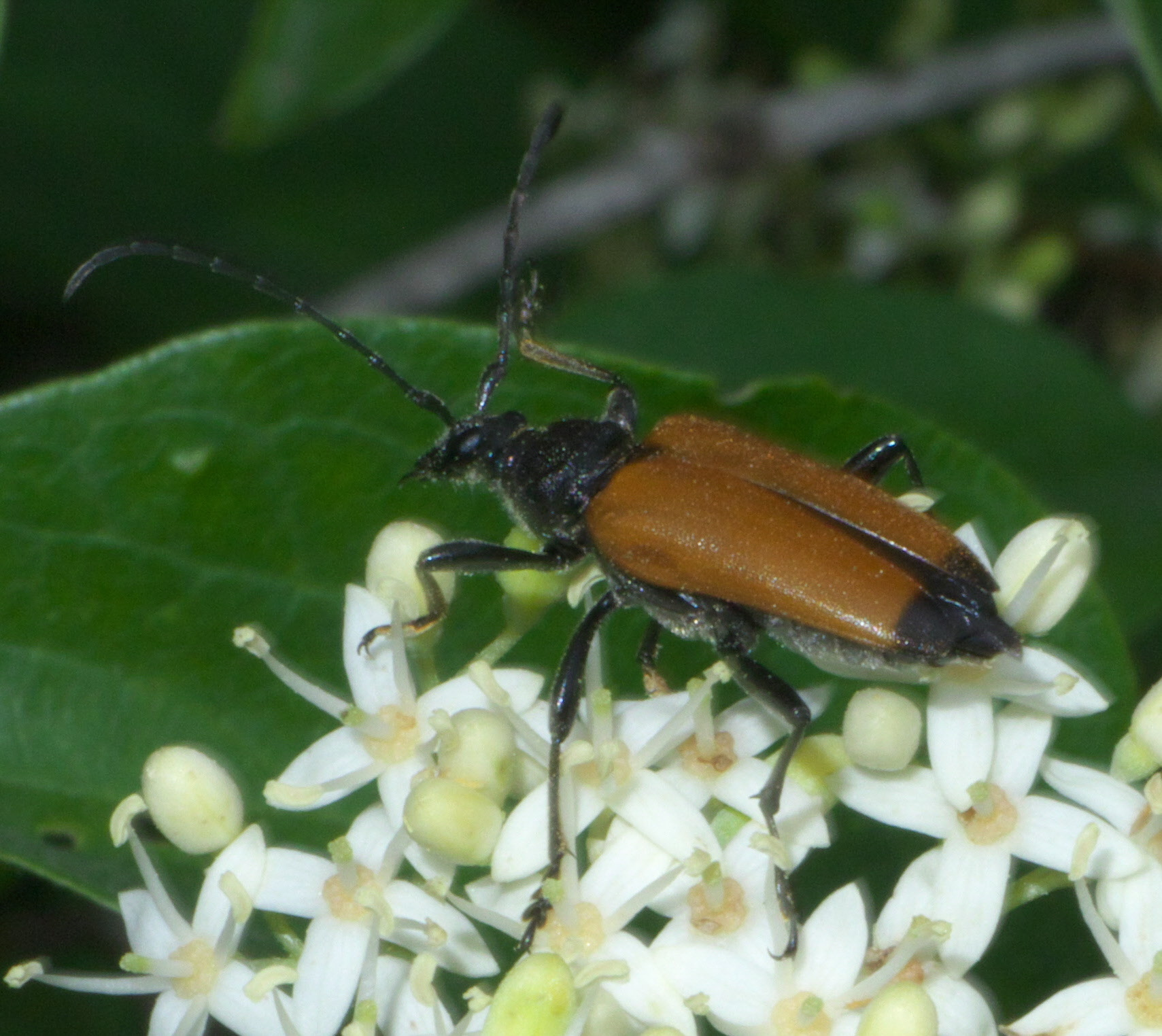

Scientific classification
- Domain: Eukaryota
- Kingdom: Animalia
- Phylum: Arthropoda
- Class: Insecta
- Order: Coleoptera
- Suborder: Polyphaga
- Infraorder: Cucujiformia
- Family: Cerambycidae
- Genus: Trigonarthris
- Species: T. atrata

Binomial name
- Trigonarthris atrata (LeConte, 1850)

Synonyms
- Trigonarthris liebecki (Hopping, 1922)

= Trigonarthris atrata =

Species of beetle

Trigonarthris atrata is a species of flower longhorn in the beetle family Cerambycidae. It is found in North America.

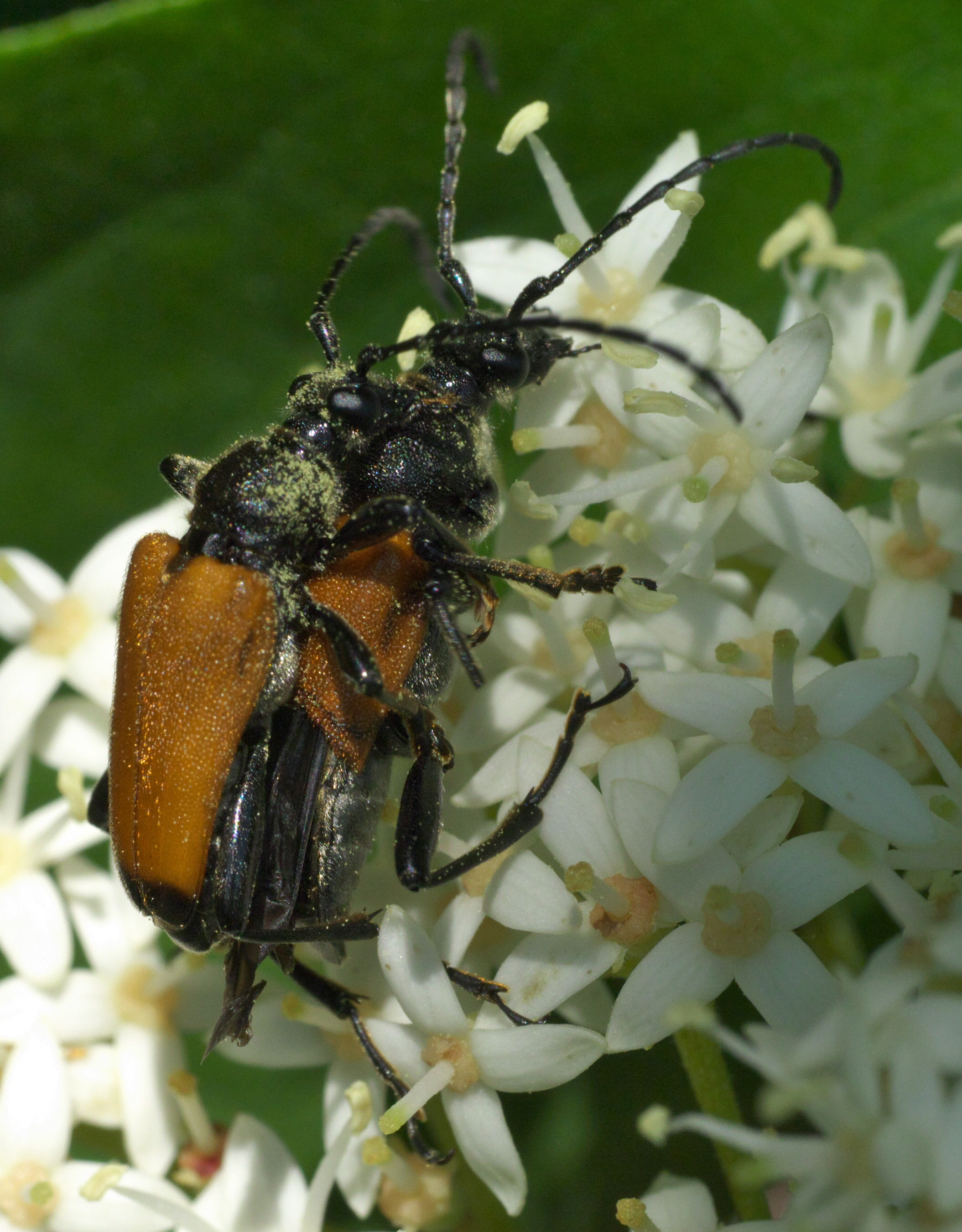
