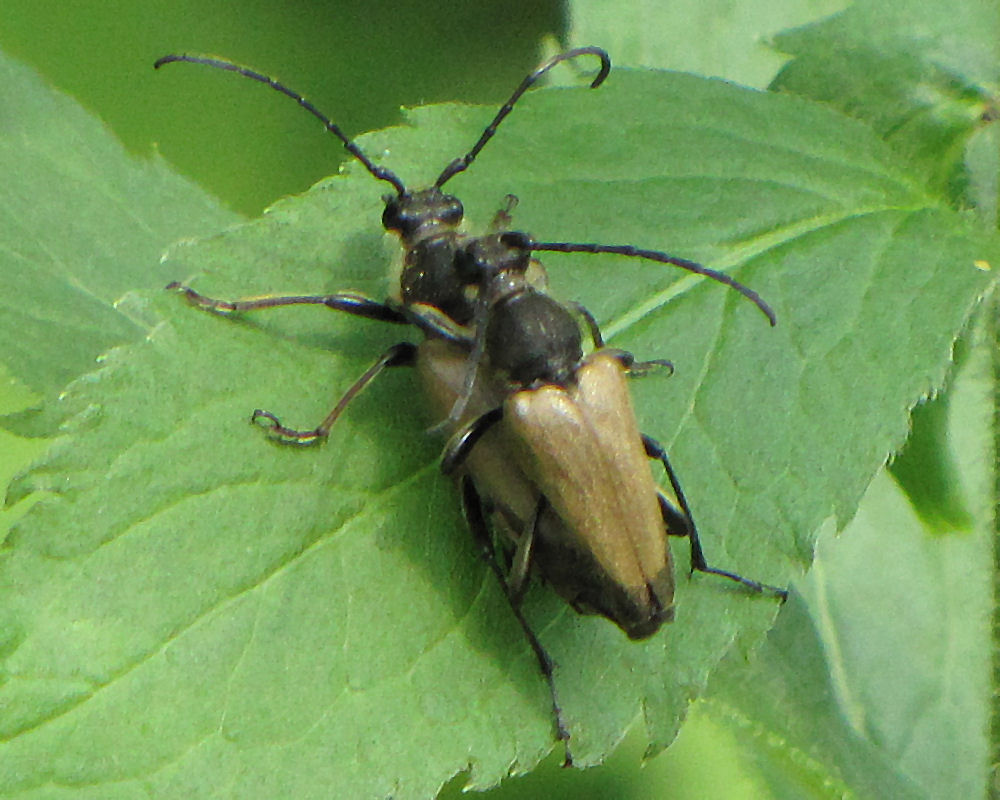
- Pair of Flower Longhorn Beetles (Trigonarthris proxima)

Scientific classification
- Kingdom: Animalia
- Phylum: Arthropoda
- Class: Insecta
- Order: Coleoptera
- Suborder: Polyphaga
- Infraorder: Cucujiformia
- Family: Cerambycidae
- Tribe: Lepturini
- Genus: Trigonarthris; Haldeman, 1847

= Trigonarthris =

Genus of beetles

Trigonarthris is a genus of flower longhorn beetles in the family Cerambycidae, containing the following species: The name is derived from the Greek τρίγωνον (trigōnon) meaning triangle and ἄρθρον (arthron) meaning joint.

== Species ==
- Trigonarthris atrata (LeConte, 1850)
- Trigonarthris minnesotana (Casey, 1913)
- Trigonarthris proxima (Say, 1824)
