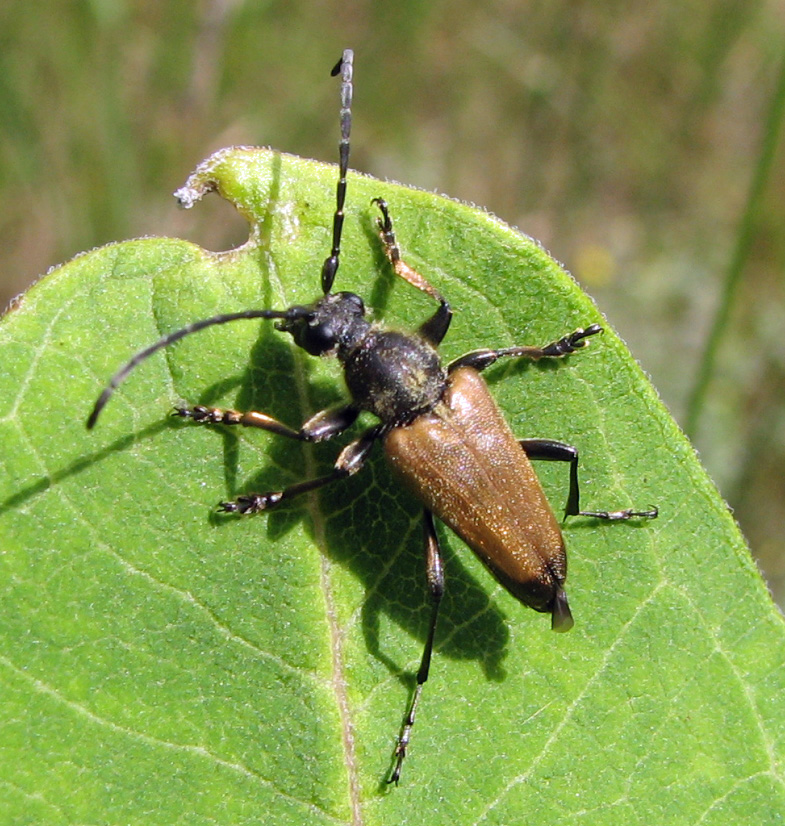

Scientific classification
- Kingdom: Animalia
- Phylum: Arthropoda
- Class: Insecta
- Order: Coleoptera
- Suborder: Polyphaga
- Infraorder: Cucujiformia
- Family: Cerambycidae
- Genus: Trigonarthris
- Species: T. minnesotana

Binomial name
- Trigonarthris minnesotana (Casey, 1913)

= Trigonarthris minnesotana =

Species of beetle

Trigonarthris minnesotana is a species of flower longhorn in the beetle family Cerambycidae. It is found in North America.
