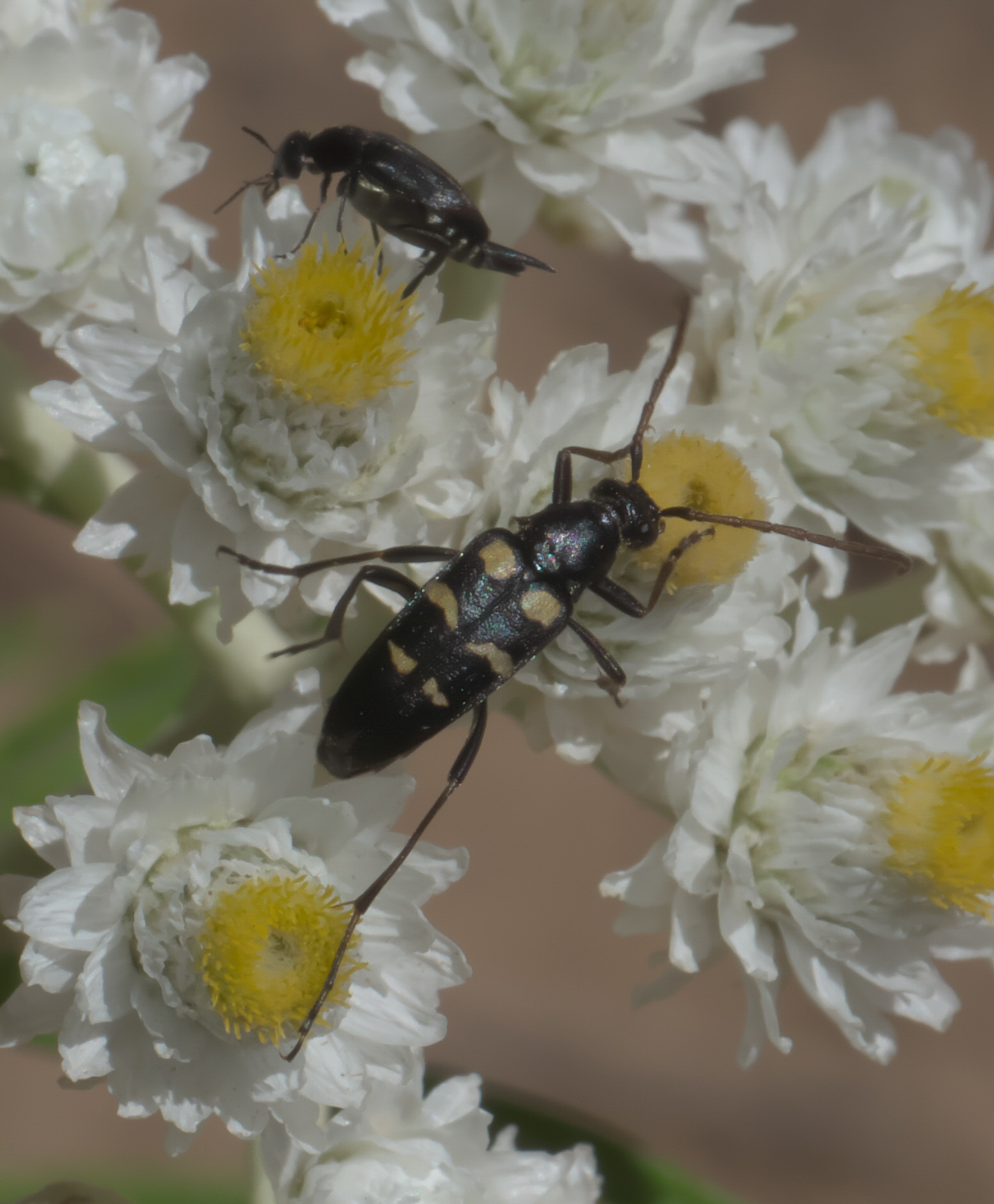

Scientific classification
- Domain: Eukaryota
- Kingdom: Animalia
- Phylum: Arthropoda
- Class: Insecta
- Order: Coleoptera
- Suborder: Polyphaga
- Infraorder: Cucujiformia
- Family: Cerambycidae
- Genus: Stenostrophia
- Species: S. amabilis

Binomial name
- Stenostrophia amabilis (LeConte, 1857)

= Stenostrophia amabilis =

Species of beetle

Stenostrophia amabilis is a species of flower longhorn in the beetle family Cerambycidae. It is found in North America.
