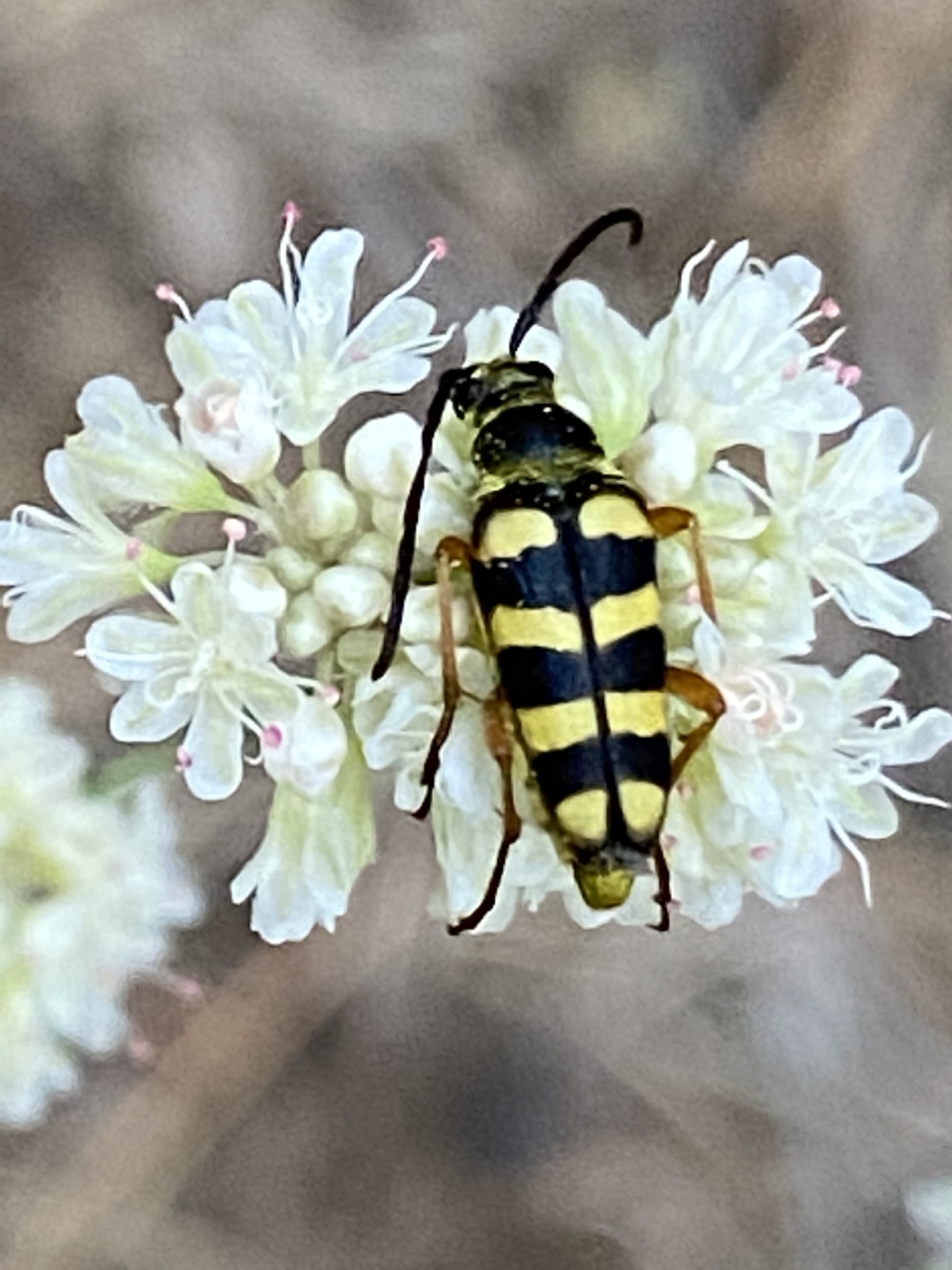

Scientific classification
- Kingdom: Animalia
- Phylum: Arthropoda
- Class: Insecta
- Order: Coleoptera
- Suborder: Polyphaga
- Infraorder: Cucujiformia
- Family: Cerambycidae
- Genus: Stenostrophia
- Species: S. tribalteata

Binomial name
- Stenostrophia tribalteata (LeConte, 1873)

= Stenostrophia tribalteata =

Species of beetle

Stenostrophia tribalteata is a species of flower longhorn in the beetle family Cerambycidae. It is found in North America.

== Subspecies ==
These three subspecies belong to the species Stenostrophia tribalteata:

- Stenostrophia tribalteata serpentina (Casey, 1891)
- Stenostrophia tribalteata sierrae Linsley & Chemsak, 1976
- Stenostrophia tribalteata tribalteata (LeConte, 1873)
