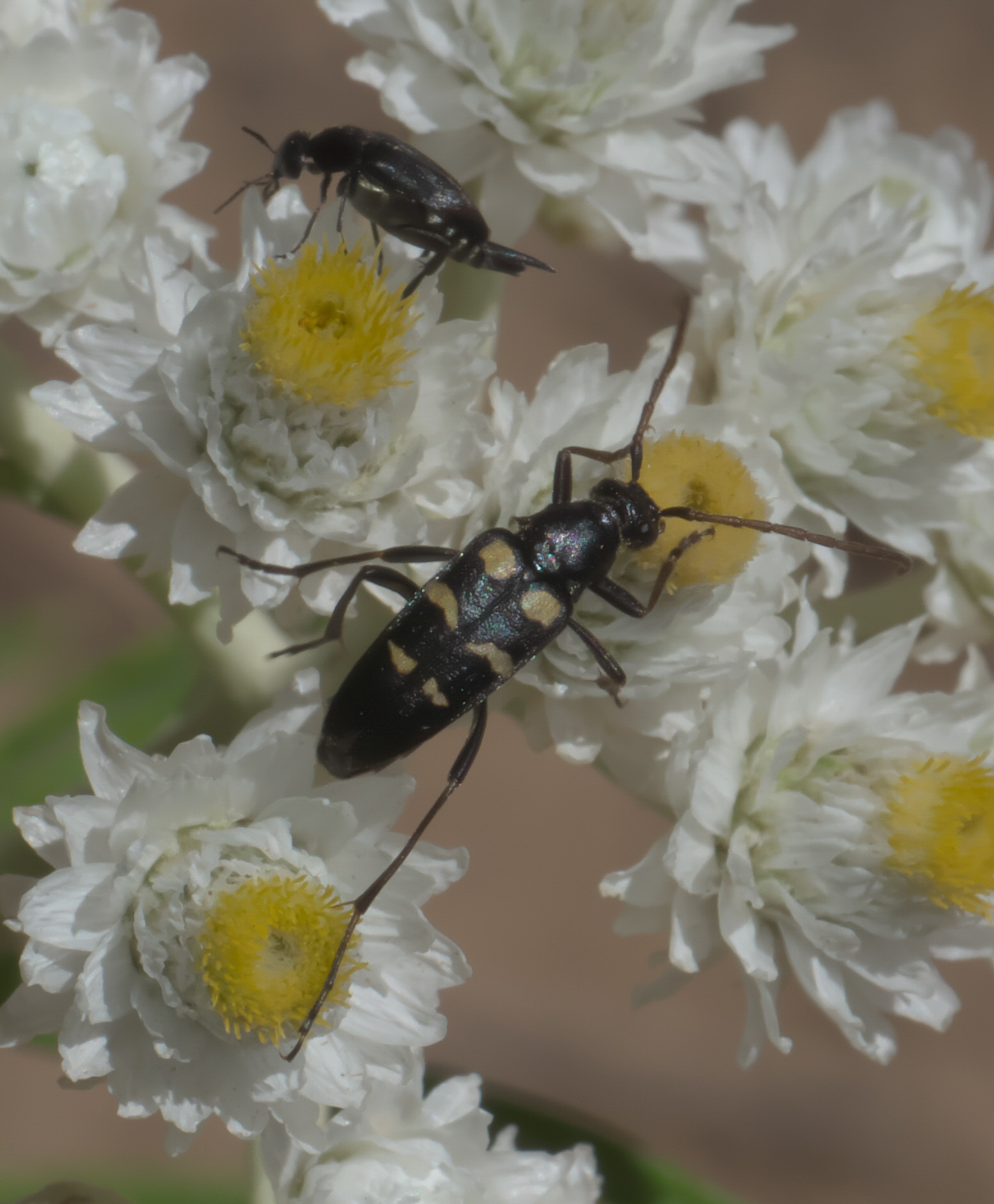
- Stenostrophia amabilis, Subfamily: Flower Longhorns.

Scientific classification
- Kingdom: Animalia
- Phylum: Arthropoda
- Class: Insecta
- Order: Coleoptera
- Suborder: Polyphaga
- Infraorder: Cucujiformia
- Family: Cerambycidae
- Tribe: Lepturini
- Genus: Stenostrophia

= Stenostrophia =

Genus of beetles

Stenostrophia is a genus of beetles in the family Cerambycidae, containing the following species:

- Stenostrophia amabilis (LeConte, 1857)
- Stenostrophia coquilletti (Linell, 1897)
- Stenostrophia tribalteata (LeConte, 1873)
