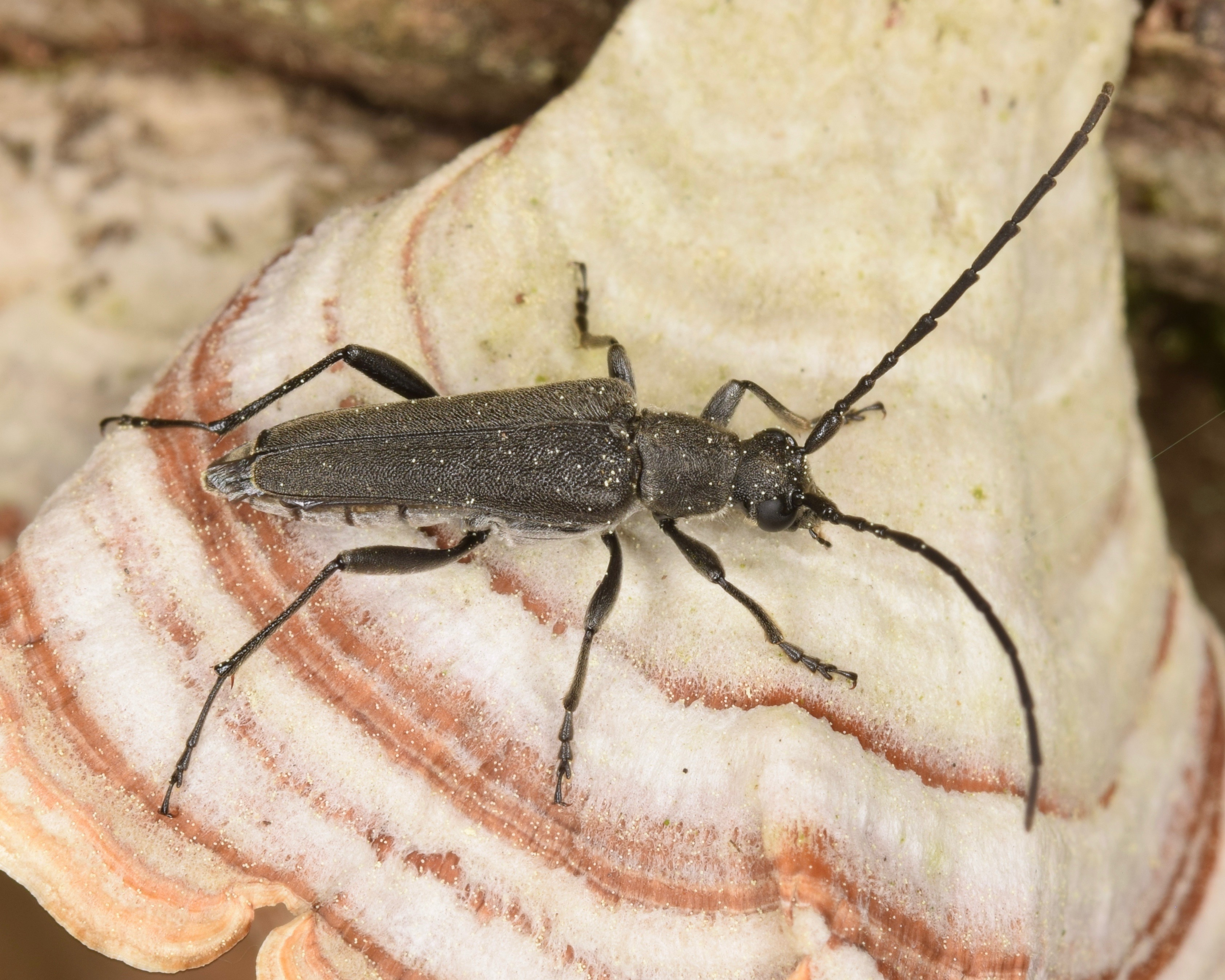

Scientific classification
- Domain: Eukaryota
- Kingdom: Animalia
- Phylum: Arthropoda
- Class: Insecta
- Order: Coleoptera
- Suborder: Polyphaga
- Infraorder: Cucujiformia
- Family: Cerambycidae
- Genus: Trachysida
- Species: T. mutabilis

Binomial name
- Trachysida mutabilis (Newman, 1841)

Synonyms
- Trachysida laetifia (Provancher, 1877); Trachysida luridipennis (Haldeman, 1847); Trachysida quadricollis (LeConte, 1850)

= Trachysida mutabilis =

Species of beetle

Trachysida mutabilis is a species of flower longhorn in the beetle family Cerambycidae. It is found in North America.
