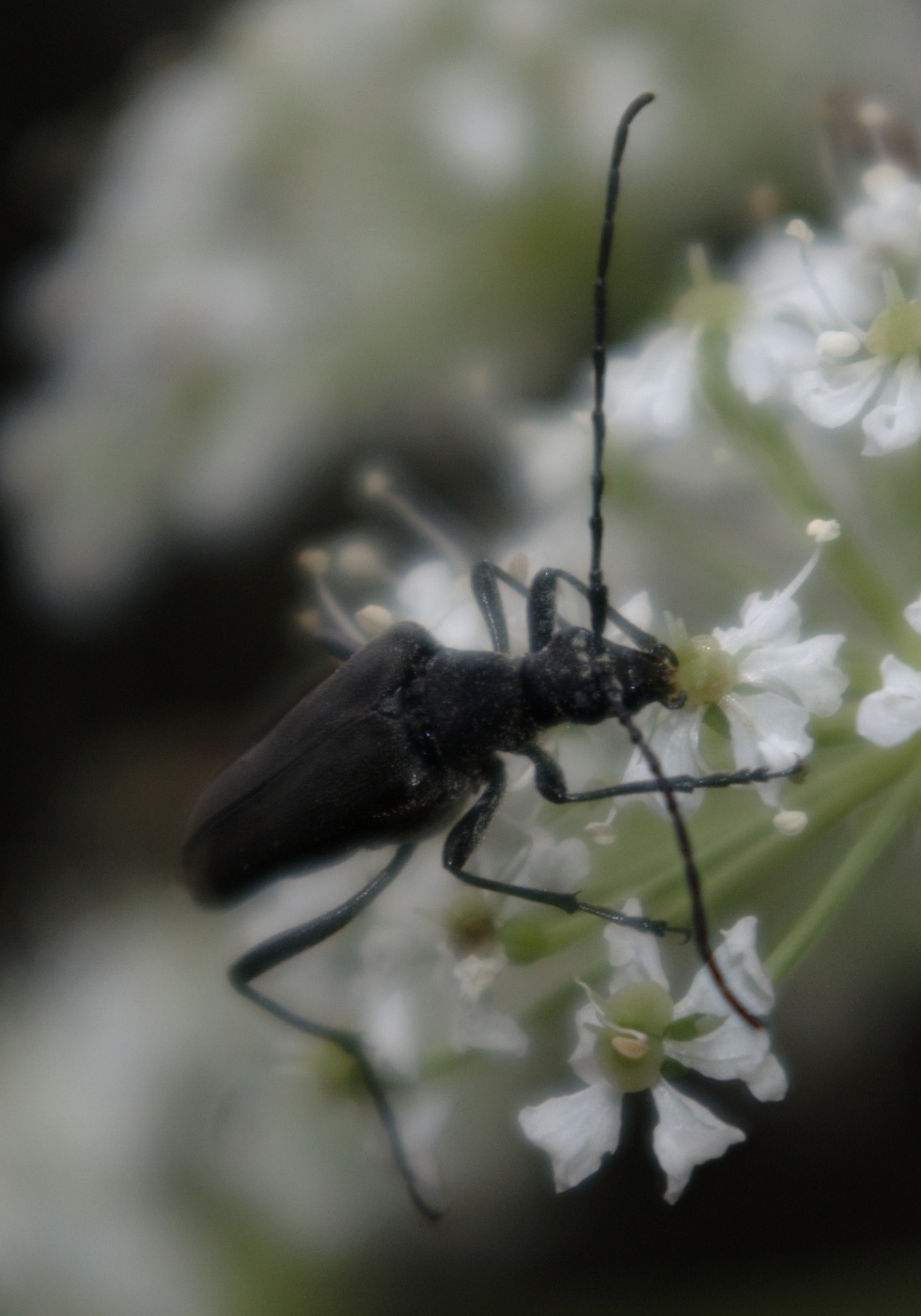

Scientific classification
- Kingdom: Animalia
- Phylum: Arthropoda
- Class: Insecta
- Order: Coleoptera
- Suborder: Polyphaga
- Infraorder: Cucujiformia
- Family: Cerambycidae
- Genus: Trachysida
- Species: T. aspera

Binomial name
- Trachysida aspera (LeConte, 1873)

= Trachysida aspera =

Species of beetle

Trachysida aspera is a species of flower longhorn in the beetle family Cerambycidae. It is found in North America.

== Subspecies ==
These three subspecies belong to the species Trachysida aspera:

- Trachysida aspera aspera (LeConte, 1873)
- Trachysida aspera brevifrons (Howden, 1959)
- Trachysida aspera rufescens Linsley & Chemsak, 1976
