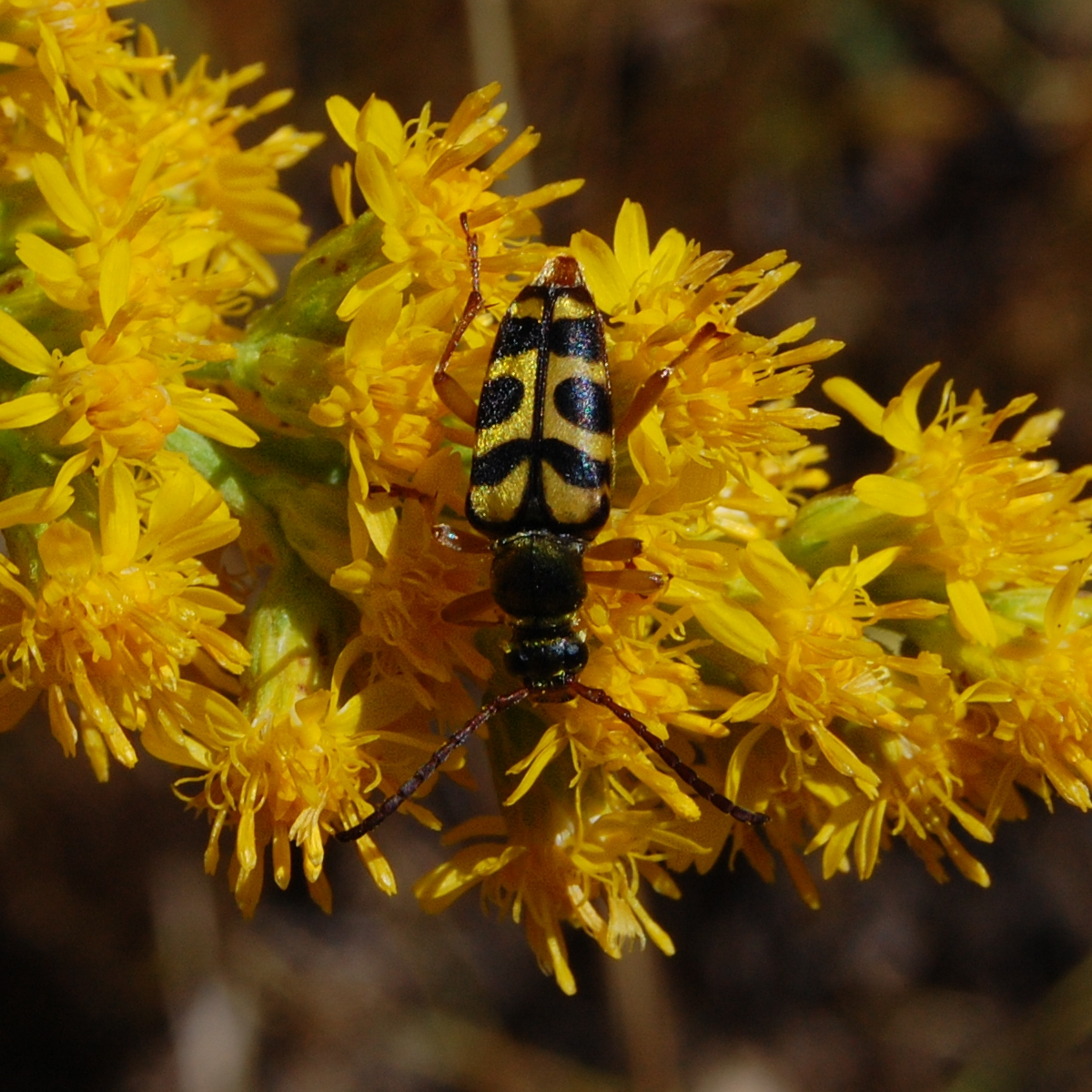

Scientific classification
- Kingdom: Animalia
- Phylum: Arthropoda
- Class: Insecta
- Order: Coleoptera
- Suborder: Polyphaga
- Infraorder: Cucujiformia
- Family: Cerambycidae
- Genus: Strophiona
- Species: S. tigrina

Binomial name
- Strophiona tigrina Casey, 1913

Synonyms
- Strophiona reducta Casey, 1913

= Strophiona tigrina =

Species of beetle

Strophiona tigrina is a species of flower longhorn in the beetle family Cerambycidae. It is found in North America.
