= Strophiona nitens =

Scientific classification
- Domain: Eukaryota
- Kingdom: Animalia
- Phylum: Arthropoda
- Class: Insecta
- Order: Coleoptera
- Suborder: Polyphaga
- Infraorder: Cucujiformia
- Family: Cerambycidae
- Genus: Strophiona
- Species: S. nitens

Binomial name
- Strophiona nitens (Forster, 1771)

Synonyms
- Strophiona bellina Casey, 1913; Strophiona quagga (Germar, 1824)

Species of beetle

Strophiona nitens, the chestnut bark borer, is a species of flower longhorn in the beetle family Cerambycidae. It is found in North America.
