= Strophiona laeta =

Scientific classification
- Domain: Eukaryota
- Kingdom: Animalia
- Phylum: Arthropoda
- Class: Insecta
- Order: Coleoptera
- Suborder: Polyphaga
- Infraorder: Cucujiformia
- Family: Cerambycidae
- Genus: Strophiona
- Species: S. laeta

Binomial name
- Strophiona laeta (LeConte, 1857)

Synonyms
- Strophiona lostenta Casey, 1913

Species of beetle

Strophiona laeta is a species of flower longhorn in the beetle family Cerambycidae.
