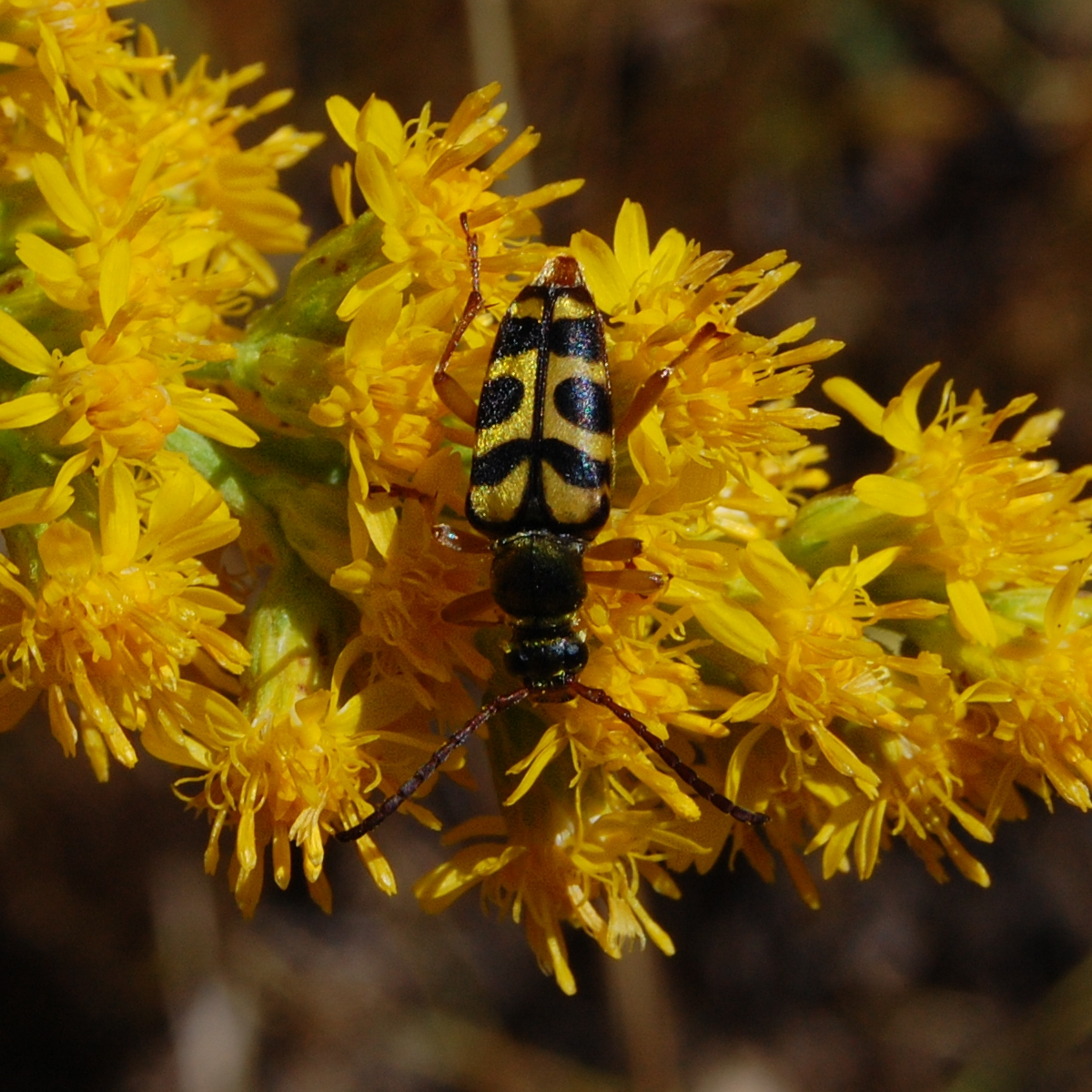
- Strophiona tigrina

Scientific classification
- Kingdom: Animalia
- Phylum: Arthropoda
- Class: Insecta
- Order: Coleoptera
- Suborder: Polyphaga
- Infraorder: Cucujiformia
- Family: Cerambycidae
- Tribe: Lepturini
- Genus: Strophiona; Strophiona Casey, 1913

= Strophiona =

Genus of beetles

Strophiona is a genus of beetles in the family Cerambycidae, containing the following species:

- Strophiona laeta (LeConte, 1857)
- Strophiona nitens (Forster, 1771)
- Strophiona tigrina Casey, 1913
