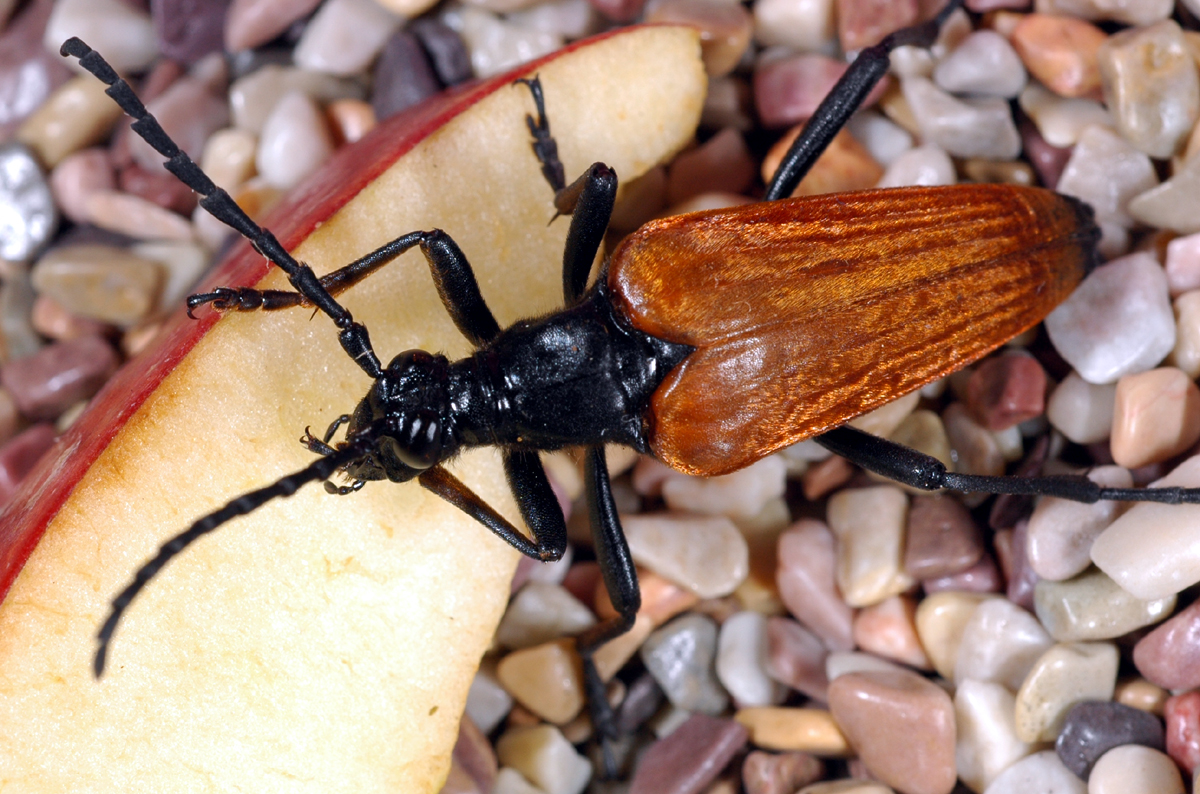

Scientific classification
- Kingdom: Animalia
- Phylum: Arthropoda
- Class: Insecta
- Order: Coleoptera
- Suborder: Polyphaga
- Infraorder: Cucujiformia
- Family: Cerambycidae
- Genus: Stenelytrana
- Species: S. emarginata

Binomial name
- Stenelytrana emarginata (Fabricius, 1787)

Synonyms
- Leptura emarginata Fabricius, 1787

= Stenelytrana emarginata =

Species of beetle

Stenelytrana emarginata is a species of flower longhorn in the beetle family Cerambycidae. It is found in North America.
