= Stenelytrana gigas =

Scientific classification
- Kingdom: Animalia
- Phylum: Arthropoda
- Class: Insecta
- Order: Coleoptera
- Suborder: Polyphaga
- Infraorder: Cucujiformia
- Family: Cerambycidae
- Genus: Stenelytrana
- Species: S. gigas

Binomial name
- Stenelytrana gigas (LeConte, 1873)

Synonyms
- Leptura gigas LeConte, 1873

Species of beetle

Stenelytrana gigas is a species of flower longhorn in the beetle family Cerambycidae. It is found in North America.
