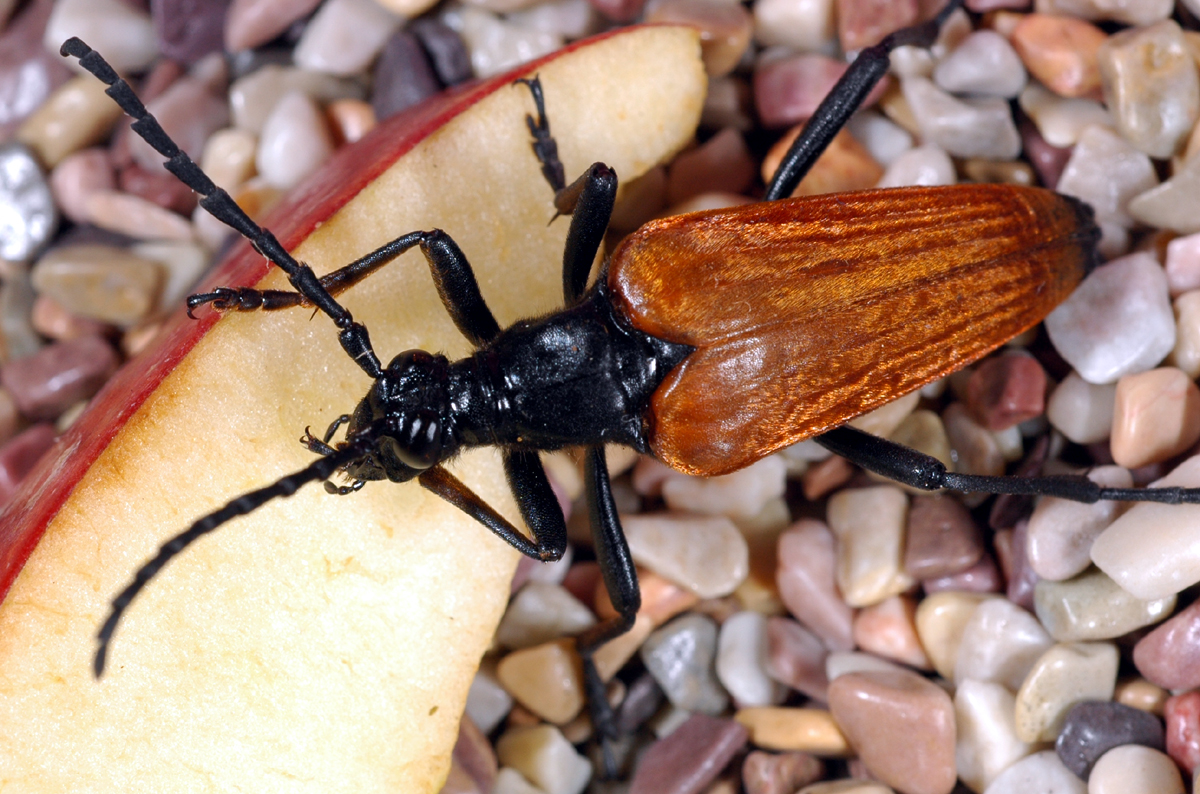
- Stenelytrana emarginata

Scientific classification
- Kingdom: Animalia
- Phylum: Arthropoda
- Class: Insecta
- Order: Coleoptera
- Suborder: Polyphaga
- Infraorder: Cucujiformia
- Family: Cerambycidae
- Tribe: Lepturini
- Genus: Stenelytrana

= Stenelytrana =

Genus of beetles

Stenelytrana is a genus of beetles in the family Cerambycidae, containing the following species:

- Stenelytrana bonaerensis (Burmeister, 1865)
- Stenelytrana emarginata (Fabricius, 1787)
- Stenelytrana gigas (LeConte, 1873)
- Stenelytrana splendens (Knull, 1935)
