= Lycochoriolaus angustatus =

Scientific classification
- Kingdom: Animalia
- Phylum: Arthropoda
- Class: Insecta
- Order: Coleoptera
- Suborder: Polyphaga
- Infraorder: Cucujiformia
- Family: Cerambycidae
- Genus: Lycochoriolaus
- Species: L. angustatus

Binomial name
- Lycochoriolaus angustatus (Melzer, 1935)

Species of beetle

Lycochoriolaus angustatus is a species of beetle in the family Cerambycidae. It was described by Melzer in 1935.
