= Lycochoriolaus angustisternis =

Scientific classification
- Kingdom: Animalia
- Phylum: Arthropoda
- Class: Insecta
- Order: Coleoptera
- Suborder: Polyphaga
- Infraorder: Cucujiformia
- Family: Cerambycidae
- Genus: Lycochoriolaus
- Species: L. angustisternis

Binomial name
- Lycochoriolaus angustisternis (Gounelle, 1911)

Species of beetle

Lycochoriolaus angustisternis is a species of beetle in the family Cerambycidae. It was described by Gounelle in 1911.
