= Lycochoriolaus costulatus =

Scientific classification
- Kingdom: Animalia
- Phylum: Arthropoda
- Class: Insecta
- Order: Coleoptera
- Suborder: Polyphaga
- Infraorder: Cucujiformia
- Family: Cerambycidae
- Genus: Lycochoriolaus
- Species: L. costulatus

Binomial name
- Lycochoriolaus costulatus (Bates, 1885)

Species of beetle

Lycochoriolaus costulatus is a species of beetle in the family Cerambycidae. It was described by Bates in 1885.
