= Lycochoriolaus lyciformis =

Scientific classification
- Kingdom: Animalia
- Phylum: Arthropoda
- Clade: Pancrustacea
- Class: Insecta
- Order: Coleoptera
- Suborder: Polyphaga
- Infraorder: Cucujiformia
- Family: Cerambycidae
- Genus: Lycochoriolaus
- Species: L. lyciformis

Binomial name
- Lycochoriolaus lyciformis (Pascoe, 1866)

Species of beetle

Lycochoriolaus lyciformis is a species of beetle in the family Cerambycidae. It was described by Pascoe in 1866.
