= Lycochoriolaus =

Scientific classification
- Kingdom: Animalia
- Phylum: Arthropoda
- Class: Insecta
- Order: Coleoptera
- Suborder: Polyphaga
- Infraorder: Cucujiformia
- Family: Cerambycidae
- Subfamily: Lepturinae
- Tribe: Lepturini
- Genus: Lycochoriolaus; Linsley & Chemsak, 1976

Genus of beetles

Lycochoriolaus is a genus of beetles in the family Cerambycidae, containing the following species:

- Lycochoriolaus angustatus (Melzer, 1935)
- Lycochoriolaus angustisternis (Gounelle, 1911)
- Lycochoriolaus ater (Gounelle, 1911)
- Lycochoriolaus aurifer (Linsley, 1970)
- Lycochoriolaus costulatus (Bates, 1885)
- Lycochoriolaus lateralis (Olivier, 1795)
- Lycochoriolaus lyciformis (Pascoe, 1866)
- Lycochoriolaus mimulus (Bates, 1885)
- Lycochoriolaus sericeus (Bates, 1885)
- Lycochoriolaus similis (Linsley, 1970)
- Lycochoriolaus xantho (Bates, 1885)
