= Lycochoriolaus similis =

Scientific classification
- Kingdom: Animalia
- Phylum: Arthropoda
- Class: Insecta
- Order: Coleoptera
- Suborder: Polyphaga
- Infraorder: Cucujiformia
- Family: Cerambycidae
- Genus: Lycochoriolaus
- Species: L. similis

Binomial name
- Lycochoriolaus similis (Linsley, 1970)

Species of beetle

Lycochoriolaus similis is a species of beetle in the family Cerambycidae. It was described by Linsley in 1970.
