= Encyclops californica =

Scientific classification
- Kingdom: Animalia
- Phylum: Arthropoda
- Class: Insecta
- Order: Coleoptera
- Suborder: Polyphaga
- Infraorder: Cucujiformia
- Family: Cerambycidae
- Genus: Encyclops
- Species: E. californica

Binomial name
- Encyclops californica Van Dyke, 1920

Species of beetle

Encyclops californica is a species of beetle in the family Cerambycidae. It was described by Van Dyke in 1920.
