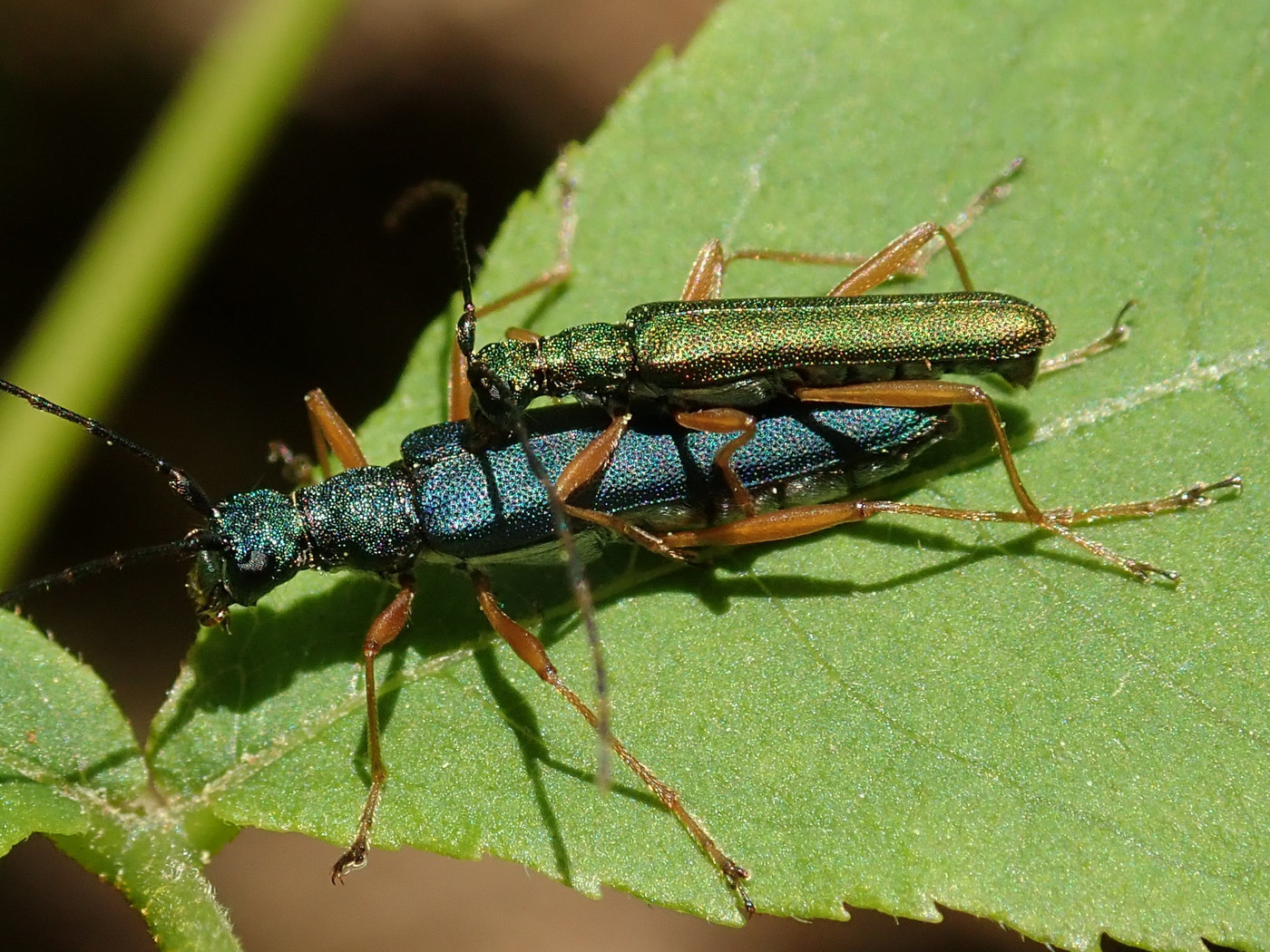

Scientific classification
- Kingdom: Animalia
- Phylum: Arthropoda
- Clade: Pancrustacea
- Class: Insecta
- Order: Coleoptera
- Suborder: Polyphaga
- Infraorder: Cucujiformia
- Family: Cerambycidae
- Genus: Encyclops
- Species: E. caerulea

Binomial name
- Encyclops caerulea (Say, 1826)

= Encyclops caerulea =

Species of beetle

Encyclops caerulea, the oak bark scaler, is a species of beetle in the family Cerambycidae. It was described by Say in 1826.
