= Encyclops =

Scientific classification
- Kingdom: Animalia
- Phylum: Arthropoda
- Class: Insecta
- Order: Coleoptera
- Suborder: Polyphaga
- Infraorder: Cucujiformia
- Family: Cerambycidae
- Subfamily: Lepturinae
- Tribe: Encyclopini
- Genus: Encyclops; Newman, 1838

Genus of beetles

Encyclops is a genus of beetles in the family Cerambycidae, containing the following species:

- Encyclops caerulea (Say, 1826)
- Encyclops californica Van Dyke, 1920
- Encyclops concinna Holzschuh, 1991
- Encyclops hubeiensis Ohbayashi & Wang, 2004
- Encyclops macilentus Kraatz, 1879
- Encyclops olivaceus Bates, 1884
- Encyclops viridipennis Makihara, 1978
- Encyclops x-signata Chiang, 1981
