= Encyclops concinna =

Scientific classification
- Kingdom: Animalia
- Phylum: Arthropoda
- Class: Insecta
- Order: Coleoptera
- Suborder: Polyphaga
- Infraorder: Cucujiformia
- Family: Cerambycidae
- Genus: Encyclops
- Species: E. concinna

Binomial name
- Encyclops concinna (Holzschuh, 1991)

Species of beetle

Encyclops concinna is a species of beetle in the family Cerambycidae. It was described by Holzschuh in 1991.
