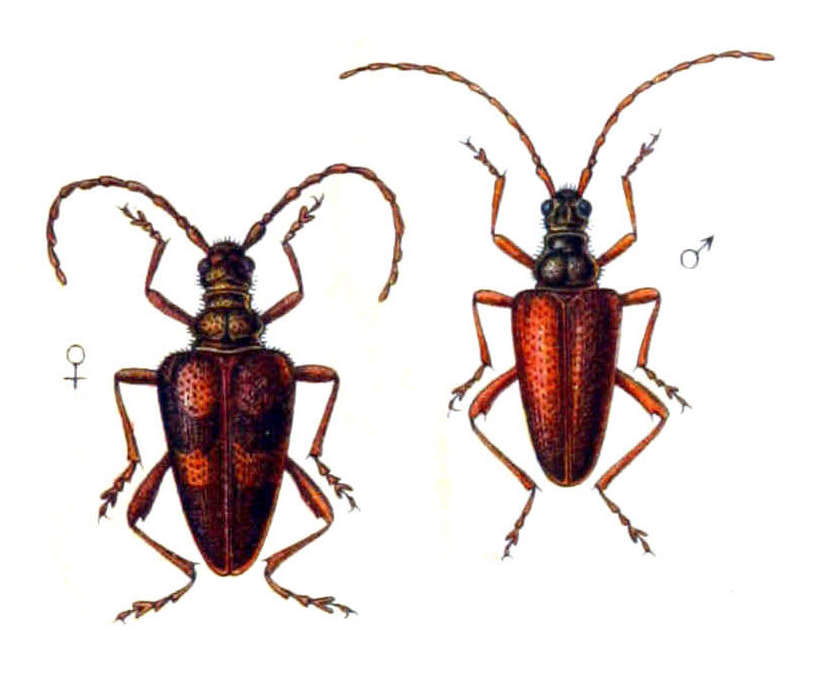
- Akimerus schaefferi adult female (left) and male (right)

Scientific classification
- Kingdom: Animalia
- Phylum: Arthropoda
- Clade: Pancrustacea
- Class: Insecta
- Order: Coleoptera
- Suborder: Polyphaga
- Infraorder: Cucujiformia
- Family: Cerambycidae
- Tribe: Rhagiini
- Genus: Akimerus; Audinet-Serville, 1835

Species
- Akimerus berchmansi; Akimerus schaefferi

= Akimerus =

Genus of beetles

Akimerus is a genus of long-horned beetles in the family Cerambycidae.
