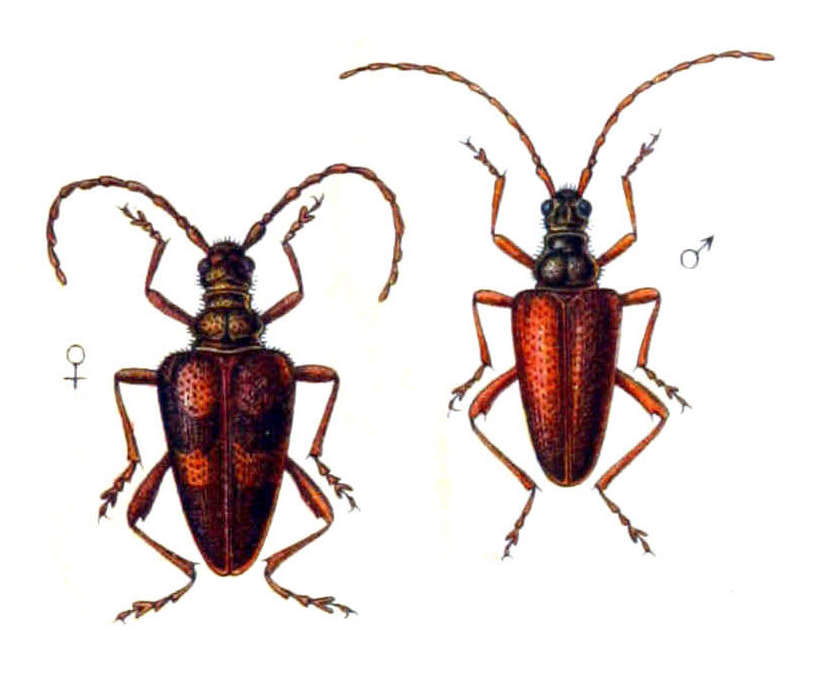
- Adult female (left) and male (right)

Scientific classification
- Kingdom: Animalia
- Phylum: Arthropoda
- Clade: Pancrustacea
- Class: Insecta
- Order: Coleoptera
- Suborder: Polyphaga
- Infraorder: Cucujiformia
- Family: Cerambycidae
- Genus: Akimerus
- Species: A. schaefferi

Binomial name
- Akimerus schaefferi (Laicharting, 1784)

Synonyms
- see text

= Akimerus schaefferi =

Species of beetle

Akimerus schaefferi is a long-horned beetle species (family (Cerambycidae). It belongs to the subfamily Lepturinae. This beetle is distributed in much of continental Europe, ranging from Iberia to Poland and Hungary, as well as in Bulgaria and Greece.

== Systematics ==
This species has two currently accepted subspecies, and two color morphs have been described in the nominate subspecies:

- Akimerus schaefferi schaefferi (Laicharting, 1784)
  - Akimerus schaefferi schaefferi var. nigrinus Pic
  - Akimerus schaefferi schaefferi var. renatae Ravalier & Barthe, 1956
- Akimerus schaefferi ariannae Perarini & Sabbadini, 2007

The latter is found only in Greece, while the former seems to occur everywhere in the species' range but probably not in Greece. The subspecies limits are not fully understood yet, and given the species' distribution, the taxonomic identity of the Bulgarian populations needs to be clarified.

A number of now-obsolete junior synonyms were formerly applied to A. schaefferi:

- Leptura schaefferi Laicharting, 1784
- Rhagium cinctum Fabricius, 1787
- Toxotus dentipes Mulsant, 1842
- Toxotus schaefferi (Laicharting, 1784)
- Acimerus schaefferi (lapsus)
