= Lepturopsis =

Scientific classification
- Kingdom: Animalia
- Phylum: Arthropoda
- Class: Insecta
- Order: Coleoptera
- Suborder: Polyphaga
- Infraorder: Cucujiformia
- Family: Cerambycidae
- Subfamily: Lepturinae
- Tribe: Lepturini
- Genus: Lepturopsis; Linsley & Chemsak, 1976

Genus of beetles

Lepturopsis is a genus of beetles in the family Cerambycidae, containing the following species:

- Lepturopsis biforis (Newman, 1841)
- Lepturopsis dolorosa (LeConte, 1861)
