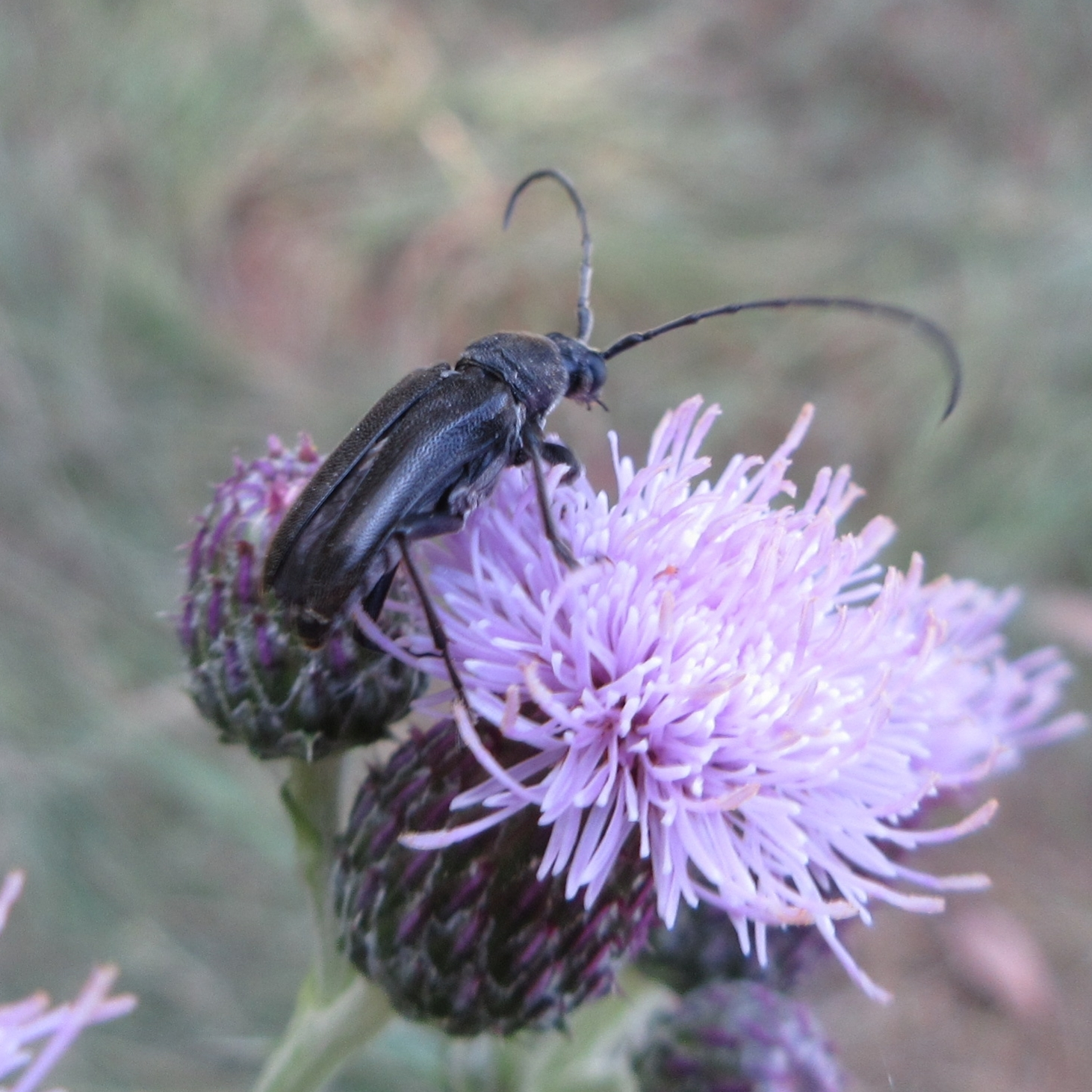
- Lepturopsis dolorosa, Washington

Scientific classification
- Kingdom: Animalia
- Phylum: Arthropoda
- Class: Insecta
- Order: Coleoptera
- Suborder: Polyphaga
- Infraorder: Cucujiformia
- Family: Cerambycidae
- Genus: Lepturopsis
- Species: L. dolorosa

Binomial name
- Lepturopsis dolorosa (LeConte, 1861)

Synonyms
- Anoplodera dolorosa Swaine & Hopping, 1928; Leptura dolorosa LeConte, 1873

= Lepturopsis dolorosa =

Species of beetle

Lepturopsis dolorosa is a species of flower longhorn in the beetle family Cerambycidae. It is found in western North America.
