= Lepturopsis biforis =

Scientific classification
- Kingdom: Animalia
- Phylum: Arthropoda
- Class: Insecta
- Order: Coleoptera
- Suborder: Polyphaga
- Infraorder: Cucujiformia
- Family: Cerambycidae
- Genus: Lepturopsis
- Species: L. biforis

Binomial name
- Lepturopsis biforis (Newman, 1841)

Species of beetle

Lepturopsis biforis is a species of beetle in the family Cerambycidae. It was described by Newman in 1841.
