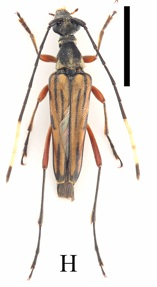

Scientific classification
- Domain: Eukaryota
- Kingdom: Animalia
- Phylum: Arthropoda
- Class: Insecta
- Order: Coleoptera
- Suborder: Polyphaga
- Infraorder: Cucujiformia
- Family: Cerambycidae
- Genus: Parastrangalis
- Species: P. communis

Binomial name
- Parastrangalis communis Holzschuh, 1993

= Parastrangalis communis =

Species of beetle

Parastrangalis communis is a species of beetle of the Cerambycidae family. This species is found in China (Sichuan) and northern Vietnam.
