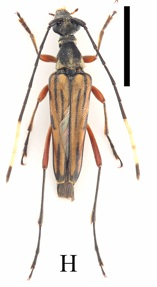
- Parastrangalis communis

Scientific classification
- Domain: Eukaryota
- Kingdom: Animalia
- Phylum: Arthropoda
- Class: Insecta
- Order: Coleoptera
- Suborder: Polyphaga
- Infraorder: Cucujiformia
- Family: Cerambycidae
- Subfamily: Lepturinae
- Tribe: Lepturini
- Genus: Parastrangalis; Ganglbauer, 1889

= Parastrangalis =

Genus of beetles

Parastrangalis is a genus of beetles in the family Cerambycidae, containing the following species:

- Parastrangalis aurata Vives, 2020
- Parastrangalis addenda Holzschuh, 2011
- Parastrangalis ambigua Holzschuh, 2007
- Parastrangalis andrei Holzschuh, 2007
- Parastrangalis annamensis Vives, 2022
- Parastrangalis ascita Holzschuh, 1999
- Parastrangalis aurigena Holzschuh, 2007
- Parastrangalis bisbidentata Holzschuh, 2007
- Parastrangalis chekianga (Gressitt, 1939)
- Parastrangalis cognata Holzschuh, 2016
- Parastrangalis communis Holzschuh, 1993
- Parastrangalis congesta Holzschuh, 1995
- Parastrangalis congruens Holzschuh, 2016
- Parastrangalis consortaria Holzschuh, 2007
- Parastrangalis crebrepunctata (Gressitt, 1939)
- Parastrangalis dalihodi Holzschuh, 1999
- Parastrangalis decepta Holzschuh, 2016
- Parastrangalis denticulata (Tamanuki, 1939)
- Parastrangalis diffluata Holzschuh, 1999
- Parastrangalis distinguenda Holzschuh, 2008
- Parastrangalis dongtieni Vives, 2020
- Parastrangalis emotoi (Hayashi & Makihara, 1981)
- Parastrangalis eucera Holzschuh, 1995
- Parastrangalis holzschuhi Chou & N. Ohbayashi, 2014
- Parastrangalis houhensis Ohbayashi & Wang, 2004
- Parastrangalis impressa Holzschuh, 1991
- Parastrangalis inarmata Holzschuh, 1991
- Parastrangalis insignis Holzschuh, 1998
- Parastrangalis interruptevittata (Pic, 1914)
- Parastrangalis intrusa Holzschuh, 2010
- Parastrangalis ishigakiensis Hayashi, 1971
- Parastrangalis jaroslavi Holzschuh, 2008
- Parastrangalis jucunda Holzschuh, 2011
- Parastrangalis lateristriata (Tamanuki & Mitono, 1939)
- Parastrangalis lesnei (Pic, 1901)
- Parastrangalis lineigera (Fairmaire, 1889)
- Parastrangalis lineigeroides Holzschuh, 2007
- Parastrangalis madarici Holzschuh, 2007
- Parastrangalis maridae Tichý & Viktora, 2017
- Parastrangalis meridionalis (Gressitt, 1942)
- Parastrangalis mitonoi (Hayashi & Iga, 1951)
- Parastrangalis munda Holzschuh, 1992
- Parastrangalis negligens Holzschuh, 1991
- Parastrangalis nymphula (Bates, 1884)
- Parastrangalis oberthuri Hayashi & Villiers, 1985
- Parastrangalis palleago Holzschuh, 1998
- Parastrangalis pallescens Holzschuh, 1993
- Parastrangalis palpalis Holzschuh, 1991
- Parastrangalis parva Holzschuh, 2010
- Parastrangalis phantoma Holzschuh, 1999
- Parastrangalis potanini (Ganglbauer, 1889)
- Parastrangalis protensa Holzschuh, 1991
- Parastrangalis puliensis (Hayashi, 1976)
- Parastrangalis sculptilis Holzschuh, 1991
- Parastrangalis shaowuensis (Gressitt, 1951)
- Parastrangalis shennongjiaensis Gu & al., 2023
- Parastrangalis subapicalis (Gressitt, 1935)
- Parastrangalis sumatrana Vives, 2020
- Parastrangalis taiwanensis Chou & N. Ohbayashi, 2010
- Parastrangalis tenuicornis (Motschulsky, 1861)
- Parastrangalis testaceicornis (Pic, 1927)
- Parastrangalis tomentosa (Tamanuki, 1943)
- Parastrangalis tristicula Holzschuh, 2007
- Parastrangalis vicinula Holzschuh, 2008
- Parastrangalis vietnamica Vives, 2019
- Parastrangalis yanoi (Tamanuki, 1939)
