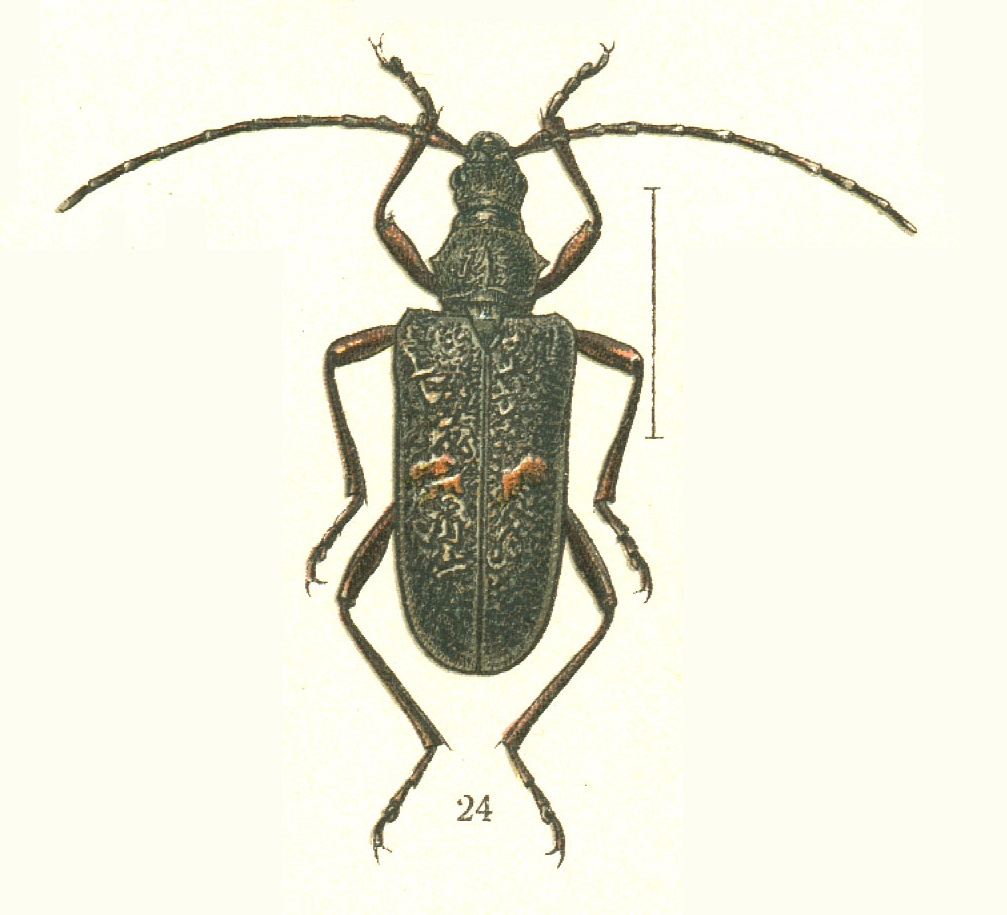
- Sachalinobia koltzei

Scientific classification
- Kingdom: Animalia
- Phylum: Arthropoda
- Class: Insecta
- Order: Coleoptera
- Suborder: Polyphaga
- Infraorder: Cucujiformia
- Family: Cerambycidae
- Subfamily: Lepturinae
- Genus: Sachalinobia; Jacobson, 1899

Synonyms
- Pseudopachyta Swaine and Hopping, 1928

= Sachalinobia =

Genus of beetles

Sachalinobia is a genus of flower longhorns in the beetle family Cerambycidae. There are at least two described species in Sachalinobia.

== Species ==
These two species belong to the genus Sachalinobia:

- Sachalinobia koltzei (Heyden, 1887)^{c g}
- Sachalinobia rugipennis (Newman, 1844)^{i c g b}

Data sources: i = ITIS, c = Catalogue of Life, g = GBIF, b = Bugguide.net
