= Sachalinobia rugipennis =

Scientific classification
- Kingdom: Animalia
- Phylum: Arthropoda
- Class: Insecta
- Order: Coleoptera
- Suborder: Polyphaga
- Infraorder: Cucujiformia
- Family: Cerambycidae
- Subfamily: Lepturinae
- Genus: Sachalinobia
- Species: S. rugipennis

Binomial name
- Sachalinobia rugipennis (Newman, 1844)

Species of beetle

Sachalinobia rugipennis is a species of flower longhorn in the beetle family Cerambycidae. It is found in North America.
