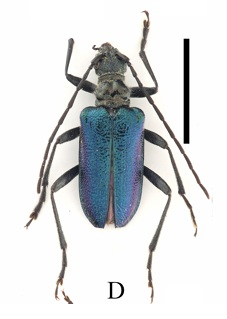
- Lemula pilifera

Scientific classification
- Domain: Eukaryota
- Kingdom: Animalia
- Phylum: Arthropoda
- Class: Insecta
- Order: Coleoptera
- Suborder: Polyphaga
- Infraorder: Cucujiformia
- Family: Cerambycidae
- Subfamily: Lepturinae
- Tribe: Rhagiini
- Genus: Lemula; Bates, 1884

= Lemula =

Genus of beetles

Lemula is a genus of beetles in the family Cerambycidae, containing the following species:

- Lemula aequipilosa N. Ohbayashi & Chou, 2019
- Lemula brunneipennis Shimomura, 1979
- Lemula coerulea Gressitt, 1939
- Lemula confusa Holzschuh, 2009
- Lemula crucifera Shimomura, 1979
- Lemula cyanipennis Hayashi, 1974
- Lemula decipiens Bates, 1884
- Lemula formosana N. Ohbayashi & Chou, 2019
- Lemula fracta Holzschuh, 1998
- Lemula gorodinskii Holzschuh, 1999
- Lemula holzschuhi N. Ohbayashi & Chou, 2019
- Lemula japonica Tamanuki, 1938
- Lemula jinfoshana N. Ohbayashi & Chou, 2019
- Lemula lata Holzschuh, 2009
- Lemula nishimurai Seki, 1944
- Lemula nitidiuscula N. Ohbayashi & Chou, 2019
- Lemula par Holzschuh, 1998
- Lemula pilifera Holzschuh, 1991
- Lemula rufithorax Pic, 1901
- Lemula setigera Mitono & Tamanuki, 1939
- Lemula shaanxiensis N. Ohbayashi & Chou, 2019
- Lemula simillima N. Ohbayashi & Chou, 2019
- Lemula testaceipennis Gressitt, 1939
- Lemula zhani N. Ohbayashi & Chou, 2019
