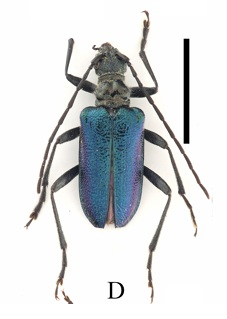

Scientific classification
- Domain: Eukaryota
- Kingdom: Animalia
- Phylum: Arthropoda
- Class: Insecta
- Order: Coleoptera
- Suborder: Polyphaga
- Infraorder: Cucujiformia
- Family: Cerambycidae
- Genus: Lemula
- Species: L. pilifera

Binomial name
- Lemula pilifera Holzschuh, 1991

= Lemula pilifera =

Species of beetle

Lemula pilifera is a species of beetle of the Cerambycidae family. This species is found in China (Sichuan, Fujian, Hubei).
