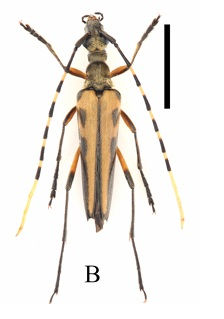
- Ischnostrangalis davidi

Scientific classification
- Domain: Eukaryota
- Kingdom: Animalia
- Phylum: Arthropoda
- Class: Insecta
- Order: Coleoptera
- Suborder: Polyphaga
- Infraorder: Cucujiformia
- Family: Cerambycidae
- Tribe: Lepturini
- Genus: Ischnostrangalis
- Species: Ischnostrangalis

Binomial name
- Ischnostrangalis Ganglbauer, 1889

= Ischnostrangalis =

Genus of beetles

Ischnostrangalis is a genus of beetles in the family Cerambycidae. All species have long bodies and a constricted pronotum. It contains the following species:

- Ischnostrangalis antennalis Holzschuh, 1991
- Ischnostrangalis apicata Holzschuh, 1992
- Ischnostrangalis davidi (Pic, 1934)
- Ischnostrangalis fasciolata Holzschuh, 2011
- Ischnostrangalis frugalis Holzschuh, 1991
- Ischnostrangalis manipurensis (Gahan, 1906)
- Ischnostrangalis ohbayashii Tichý & Lin, 2021
- Ischnostrangalis rhododendri Holzschuh, 2011
- Ischnostrangalis semenowi (Ganglbauer, 1889)
- Ischnostrangalis stricticollis (Fairmaire, 1889)
- Ischnostrangalis tibetensis N. Ohbayashi & Lin, 2013
- Ischnostrangalis wenhsini Ohbayashi N. & Lin, 2013
