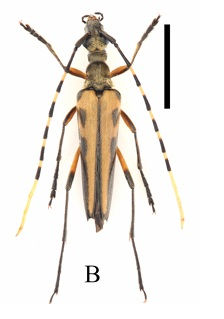

Scientific classification
- Kingdom: Animalia
- Phylum: Arthropoda
- Class: Insecta
- Order: Coleoptera
- Suborder: Polyphaga
- Infraorder: Cucujiformia
- Family: Cerambycidae
- Genus: Ischnostrangalis
- Species: I. davidi

Binomial name
- Ischnostrangalis davidi (Pic, 1934)

Synonyms
- Leptura (Parastrangalis) davidi Pic, 1934

= Ischnostrangalis davidi =

Species of beetle

Ischnostrangalis davidi is a species of beetle of the Cerambycidae family. This species is found in China (Sichuan).
