= Pygoleptura nigrella =

Scientific classification
- Domain: Eukaryota
- Kingdom: Animalia
- Phylum: Arthropoda
- Class: Insecta
- Order: Coleoptera
- Suborder: Polyphaga
- Infraorder: Cucujiformia
- Family: Cerambycidae
- Genus: Pygoleptura
- Species: P. nigrella

Binomial name
- Pygoleptura nigrella (Say, 1826)

Species of beetle

Pygoleptura nigrella is a species of flower longhorn in the beetle family Cerambycidae. It is found in North America.

== Subspecies ==
These two subspecies belong to the species Pygoleptura nigrella:

- Pygoleptura nigrella nigrella (Say, 1826)
- Pygoleptura nigrella oregonensis Linsley & Chemsak, 1976
