= Pygoleptura =

Scientific classification
- Kingdom: Animalia
- Phylum: Arthropoda
- Class: Insecta
- Order: Coleoptera
- Suborder: Polyphaga
- Infraorder: Cucujiformia
- Family: Cerambycidae
- Subfamily: Lepturinae
- Tribe: Lepturini
- Genus: Pygoleptura; Linsley & Chemsak, 1976

Genus of beetles

Pygoleptura is a genus of beetles in the family Cerambycidae, containing the following species:

- Pygoleptura brevicornis (LeConte, 1873)
- Pygoleptura carbonata (LeConte, 1861)
- Pygoleptura nigrella (Say, 1826)
