= Pygoleptura carbonata =

Scientific classification
- Domain: Eukaryota
- Kingdom: Animalia
- Phylum: Arthropoda
- Class: Insecta
- Order: Coleoptera
- Suborder: Polyphaga
- Infraorder: Cucujiformia
- Family: Cerambycidae
- Genus: Pygoleptura
- Species: P. carbonata

Binomial name
- Pygoleptura carbonata (LeConte, 1861)

Species of beetle

Pygoleptura carbonata is a species of flower longhorn in the beetle family Cerambycidae. It is found in North America.
