= Pygoleptura brevicornis =

Scientific classification
- Kingdom: Animalia
- Phylum: Arthropoda
- Class: Insecta
- Order: Coleoptera
- Suborder: Polyphaga
- Infraorder: Cucujiformia
- Family: Cerambycidae
- Genus: Pygoleptura
- Species: P. brevicornis

Binomial name
- Pygoleptura brevicornis (LeConte, 1873)

Species of beetle

Pygoleptura brevicornis is a species of flower longhorns in the beetle family Cerambycidae. It is found in North America.
