= Cerrostrangalia =

Scientific classification
- Kingdom: Animalia
- Phylum: Arthropoda
- Class: Insecta
- Order: Coleoptera
- Suborder: Polyphaga
- Infraorder: Cucujiformia
- Family: Cerambycidae
- Subfamily: Lepturinae
- Tribe: Lepturini
- Genus: Cerrostrangalia; Hovore & Chemsak, 2005

Genus of beetles

Cerrostrangalia is a genus of beetles in the family Cerambycidae, containing the following species:

- Cerrostrangalia herrerai Hovore & Chemsak, 2005
- Cerrostrangalia solisi Hovore & Chemsak, 2005
