= Cerrostrangalia herrerai =

Scientific classification
- Kingdom: Animalia
- Phylum: Arthropoda
- Class: Insecta
- Order: Coleoptera
- Suborder: Polyphaga
- Infraorder: Cucujiformia
- Family: Cerambycidae
- Genus: Cerrostrangalia
- Species: C. herrerai

Binomial name
- Cerrostrangalia herrerai Hovore & Chemsak, 2005

Species of beetle

Cerrostrangalia herrerai is a species of beetle in the family Cerambycidae. It was described by Hovore and Chemsak in 2005.
