= Neoalosterna =

Scientific classification
- Domain: Eukaryota
- Kingdom: Animalia
- Phylum: Arthropoda
- Class: Insecta
- Order: Coleoptera
- Suborder: Polyphaga
- Infraorder: Cucujiformia
- Family: Cerambycidae
- Tribe: Lepturini
- Genus: Neoalosterna

Genus of beetles

Neoalosterna is a genus of beetles in the family Cerambycidae, containing the following species:

- Neoalosterna capitata (Newman, 1841)
- Neoalosterna rubida (LeConte, 1873)
