= Neoalosterna capitata =

Scientific classification
- Domain: Eukaryota
- Kingdom: Animalia
- Phylum: Arthropoda
- Class: Insecta
- Order: Coleoptera
- Suborder: Polyphaga
- Infraorder: Cucujiformia
- Family: Cerambycidae
- Genus: Neoalosterna
- Species: N. capitata

Binomial name
- Neoalosterna capitata (Newman, 1841)

Species of beetle

Neoalosterna capitata is a species of flower longhorn in the beetle family Cerambycidae. It is found in North America.
