= Neoalosterna rubida =

Scientific classification
- Kingdom: Animalia
- Phylum: Arthropoda
- Class: Insecta
- Order: Coleoptera
- Suborder: Polyphaga
- Infraorder: Cucujiformia
- Family: Cerambycidae
- Genus: Neoalosterna
- Species: N. rubida

Binomial name
- Neoalosterna rubida (LeConte, 1873)

Synonyms
- Neoalosterna keeni (Casey, 1913)

Species of beetle

Neoalosterna rubida is a species of flower longhorn in the beetle family Cerambycidae. It is found in North America.
