= Fauna of Illinois =

The fauna of Illinois include a wide variety of mammals, birds, amphibians, reptiles, fish and insects.

== Officially recognized state animals ==
Official state animal
Type	Common name	Scientific name	Picture
State bird	northern cardinal	Cardinalis cardinalis	
State insect	monarch butterfly	Danaus plexippus	
State bee	black and gold bumble bee	Bombus auricomus	
State animal	white-tailed deer	Odocoileus virginianus	
State fish	bluegill	Lepomis macrochirus	
State fossil	Tully monster	Tullimonstrum	
State amphibian	eastern tiger salamander	Ambystoma tigrinum	
State reptile	painted turtle	Chrysemys picta	
State snake	eastern milk snake	Lampropeltis triangulum triangulum	

== List of Illinois species ==
These lists includ species known to live in the state of Illinois. This includes native species, naturalized species, and known invasives. These lists are incomplete.

=== Mammals ===
- American badger
- American mink
- American pygmy shrew
- Big brown bat
- Bobcat
- Cinereus shrew
- Cotton mouse
- Coyote
- Cougar
- American black bear
- Eastern cottontail
- Eastern mole
- Eastern pipistrelle
- Eastern red bat
- Eastern chipmunk
- Eastern gray squirrel
- Evening bat
- Eastern woodrat
- Franklin's ground squirrel
- Golden mouse
- Gray bat
- Gray fox
- Groundhog
- Hoary bat
- House mouse
- Indiana bat
- Least weasel
- Little brown bat
- Long-tailed weasel
- Marsh rice rat
- Meadow vole
- Meadow jumping mouse
- Muskrat
- Nine-banded armadillo
- North American beaver
- North American least shrew
- North American river otter
- Northern short-tailed shrew
- Norway rat
- Deer mouse
- Plains pocket gopher
- Prairie vole
- Raccoon
- Rafinesque's big-eared bat
- Red fox
- Red squirrel
- Silver-haired bat
- Southeastern shrew
- Southeastern myotis
- Southern bog lemming
- Southern short-tailed shrew
- Southern flying squirrel
- Striped skunk
- Swamp rabbit
- Thirteen-lined ground squirrel
- Virginia opossum
- Western harvest mouse
- White-footed mouse
- White-tailed deer
- American bison
- Woodland vole

=== Birds ===

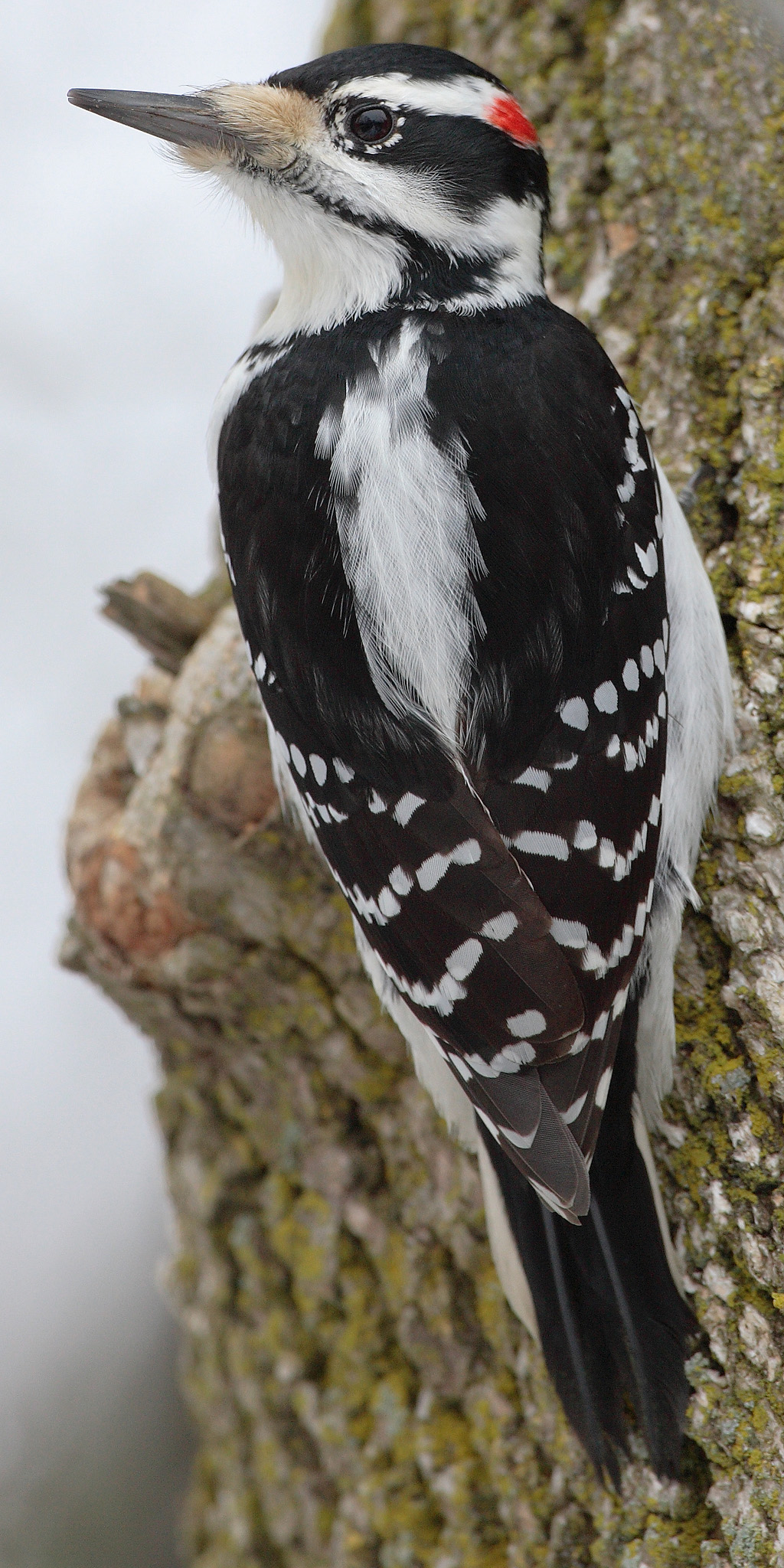

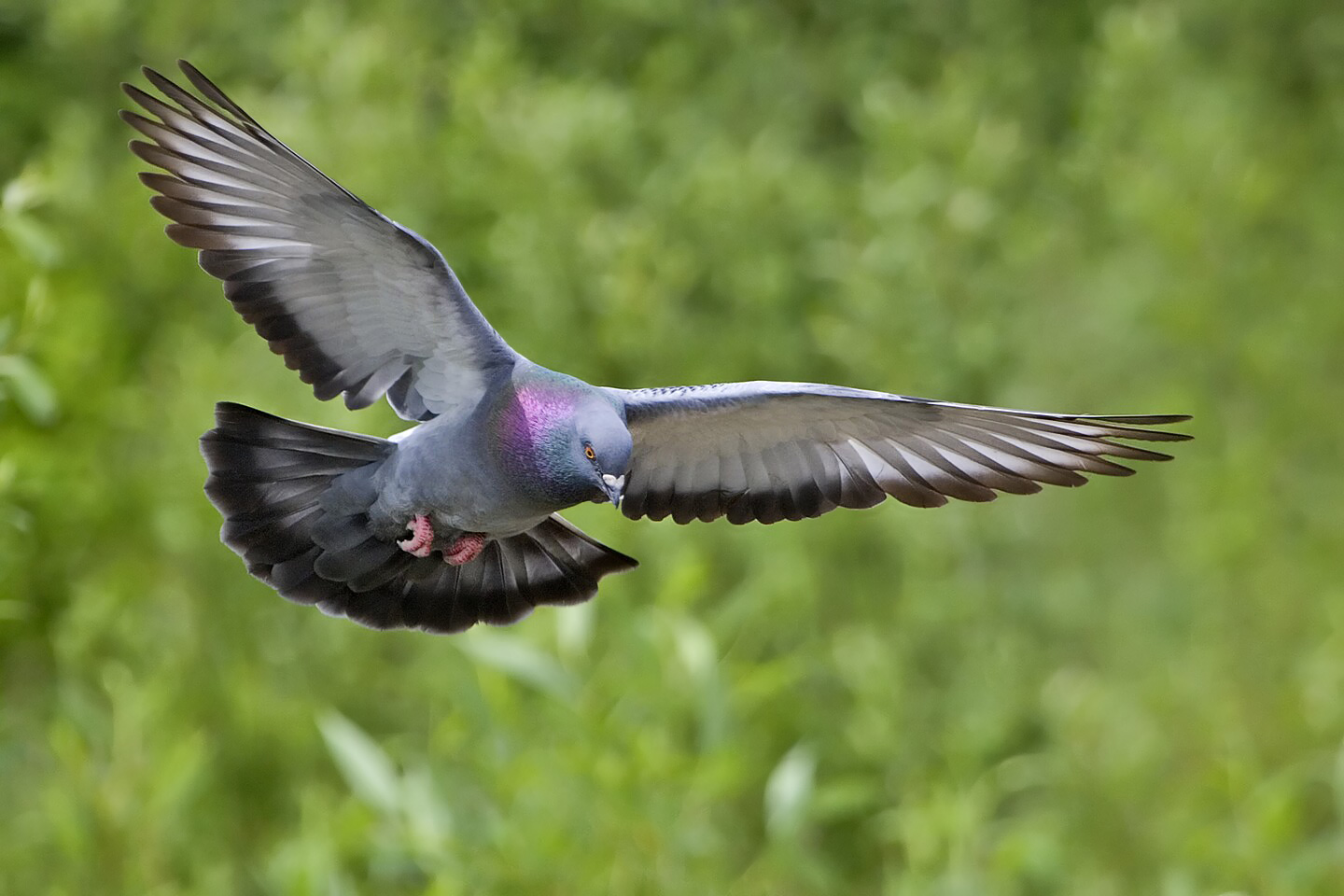

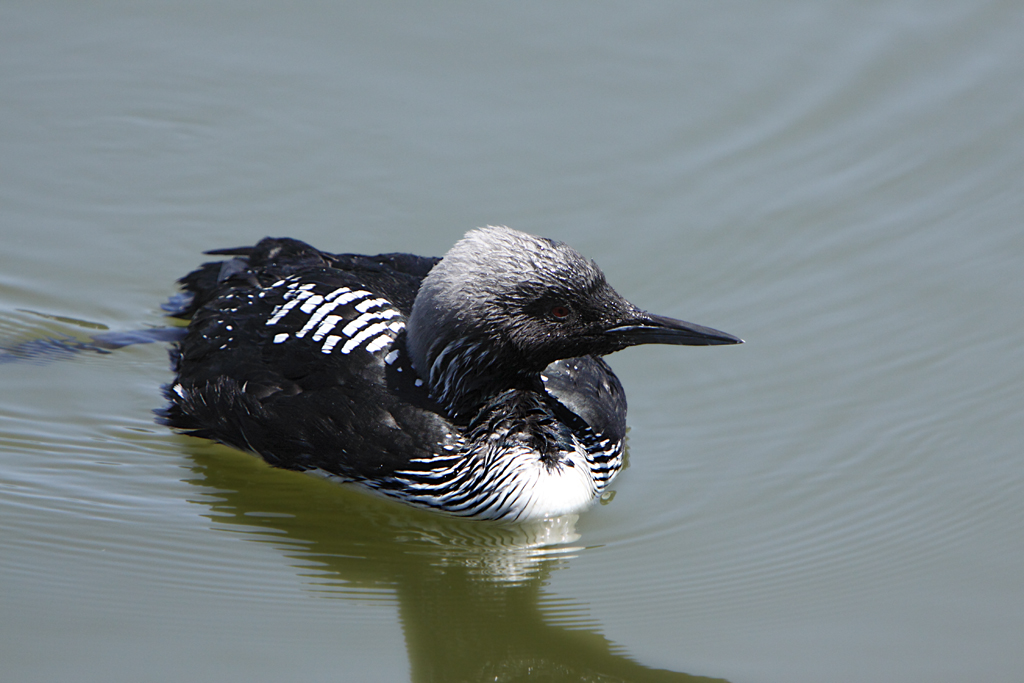

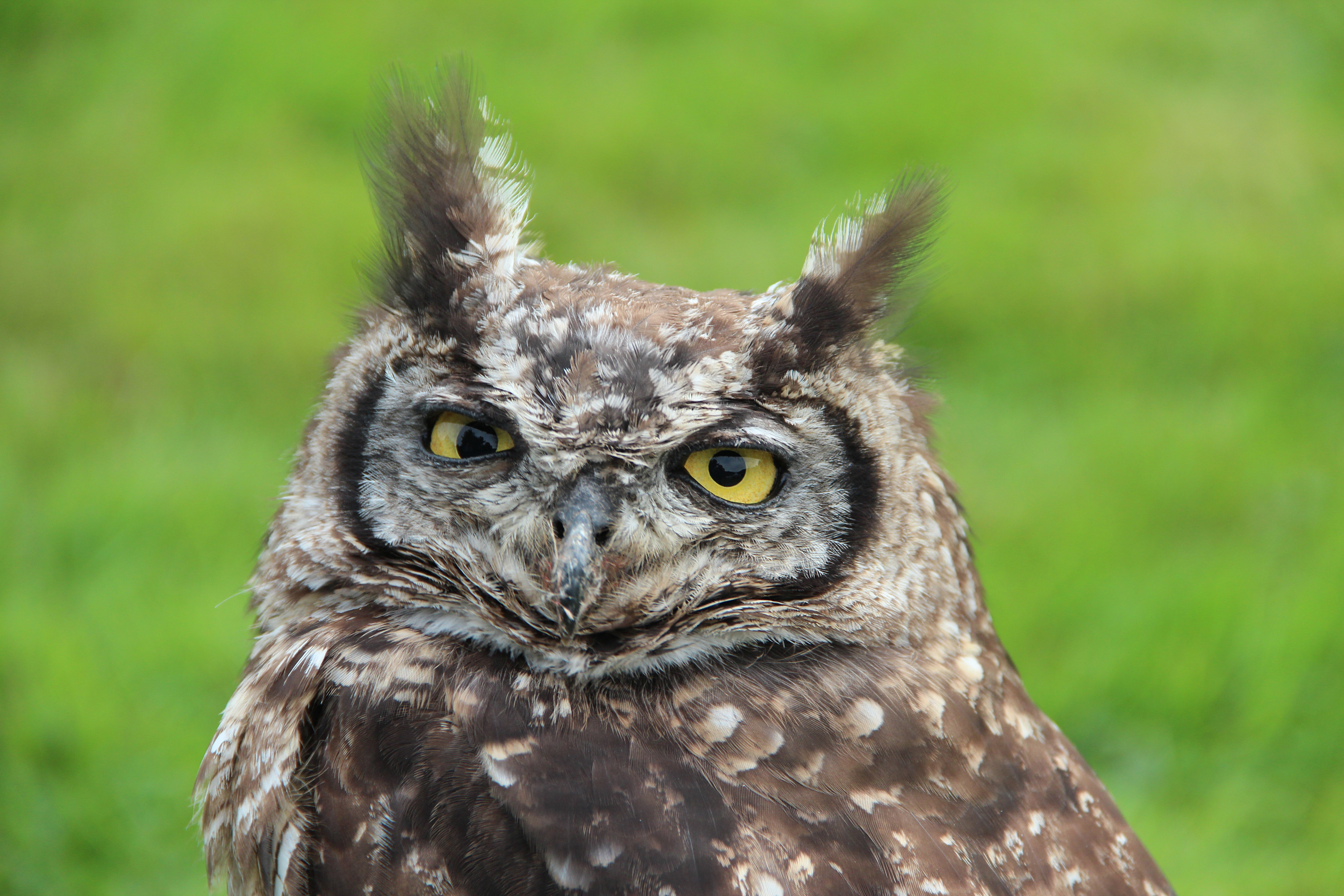

- Fulvous whistling duck
- Black-bellied whistling-duck
- Greater white-fronted goose
- Snow goose
- Ross's goose
- Cackling goose
- Canada goose
- Mute swan
- Trumpeter swan
- Tundra swan
- Wood duck
- Gadwall
- Eurasian wigeon
- American wigeon
- American black duck
- Mallard
- Mottled duck
- Blue-winged teal
- Cinnamon teal
- Northern shoveler
- White-cheeked pintail
- Northern pintail
- Garganey
- Green-winged teal
- Canvasback
- Redhead
- Ring-necked duck
- Tufted duck
- Greater scaup
- Lesser scaup
- King eider
- Common eider
- Harlequin duck
- Surf scoter
- White-winged scoter
- Black scoter
- Long-tailed duck
- Bufflehead
- Common goldeneye
- Barrow's goldeneye
- Hooded merganser
- Common merganser
- Red-breasted merganser
- Ruddy duck
- Gray partridge
- Ring-necked pheasant
- Greater prairie chicken
- Northern bobwhite
- Red-throated loon
- Black-throated loon
- Pacific loon
- Common loon
- Yellow-billed loon
- Pied-billed grebe
- Horned grebe
- Red-necked grebe
- Black-necked grebe
- Western grebe
- Clark's grebe
- Northern gannet
- American white pelican
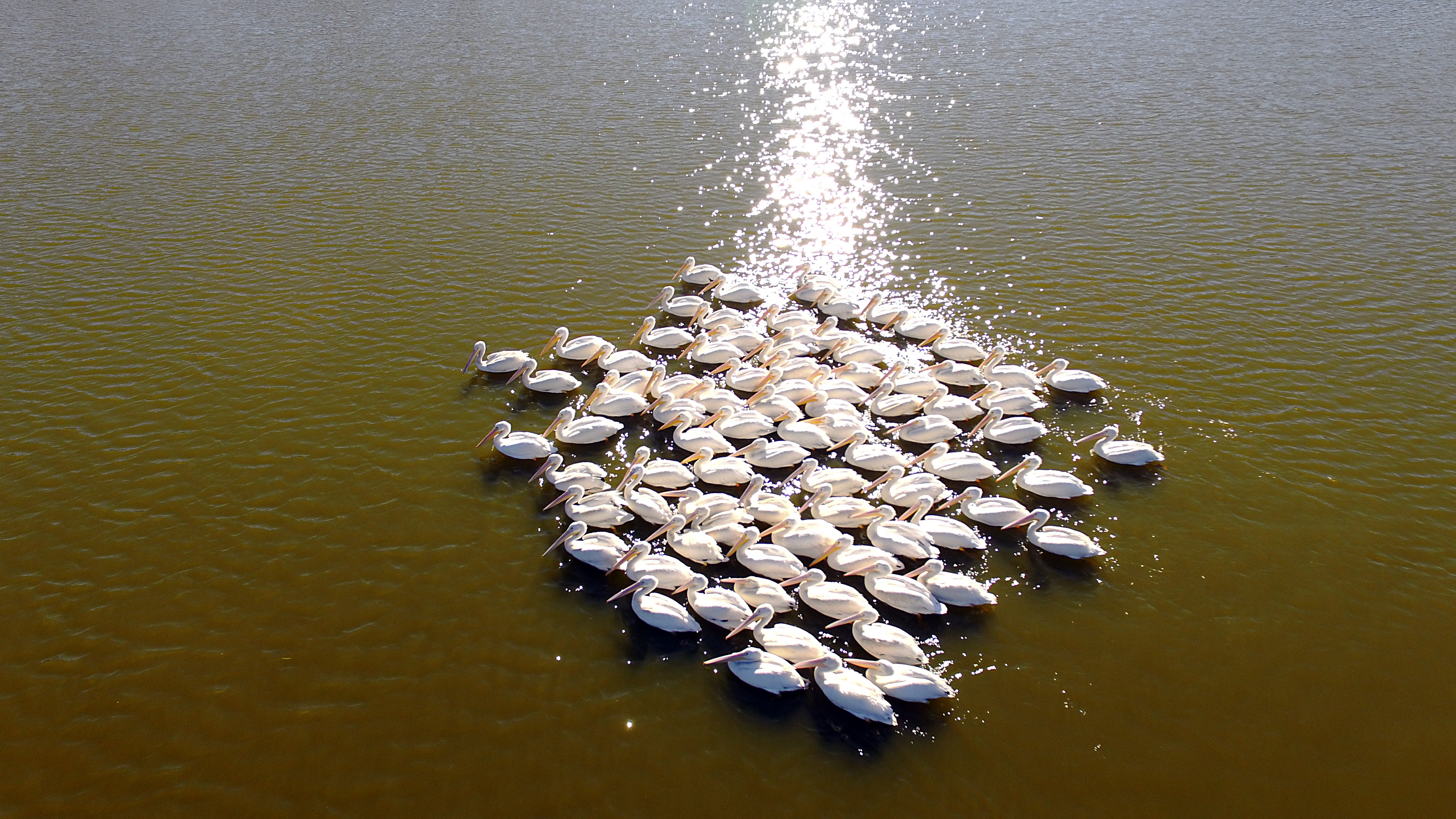
  American white pelicans on the Illinois River
- Brown pelican
- Double-crested cormorant
- Neotropic cormorant
- Anhinga
- Magnificent frigatebird
- American bittern
- Least bittern
- Great blue heron
- Great egret
- Snowy egret
- Little blue heron
- Tricolored heron
- Reddish egret
- Cattle egret
- Green heron
- Black-crowned night heron
- Yellow-crowned night heron
- American white ibis
- Glossy ibis
- White-faced ibis
- Wood stork
- Black vulture
- Turkey vulture
- Osprey
- Swallow-tailed kite
- White-tailed kite
- Mississippi kite
- Bald eagle
- Hen harrier
- Sharp-shinned hawk
- Cooper's hawk
- Northern goshawk
- Red-shouldered hawk
- Broad-winged hawk
- Swainson's hawk
- Red-tailed hawk
- Ferruginous hawk
- Rough-legged buzzard
- Golden eagle
- American kestrel
- Merlin
- Gyrfalcon
- Prairie falcon
- Yellow rail
- Black rail
- King rail
- Virginia rail
- American purple gallinule
- Common moorhen
- American coot
- Sandhill crane
- Whooping crane
- Black-bellied plover
- American golden plover
- Snowy plover
- Killdeer
- Black-necked stilt
- American avocet
- Greater yellowlegs
- Lesser yellowlegs
- Solitary sandpiper
- Willet
- Spotted sandpiper
- Upland sandpiper
- Eskimo curlew
- Whimbrel
- Long-billed curlew
- Hudsonian godwit
- Marbled godwit
- Ruddy turnstone
- Red knot
- Sanderling
- Semipalmated sandpiper
- Western sandpiper
- Least sandpiper
- White-rumped sandpiper
- Baird's sandpiper
- Pectoral sandpiper
- Sharp-tailed sandpiper
- Purple sandpiper
- Dunlin
- Curlew sandpiper
- Stilt sandpiper
- Buff-breasted sandpiper
- Ruff
- Short-billed dowitcher
- Long-billed dowitcher
- Wilson's snipe
- American woodcock
- Wilson's phalarope
- Red phalarope
- Red-necked phalarope
- Long-tailed jaeger
- Parasitic jaeger
- Pomarine jaeger
- Laughing gull
- Franklin's gull
- Little gull
- Black-headed gull
- Bonaparte's gull
- Common gull
- Ring-billed gull
- California gull
- American herring gull
- Thayer's gull
- Iceland gull
- Lesser black-backed gull
- Slaty-backed gull
- Western gull
- Glaucous-winged gull
- Glaucous gull
- Great black-backed gull
- Sabine's gull
- Black-legged kittiwake
- Ross's gull
- Ivory gull
- Gull-billed tern
- Caspian tern
- Royal tern
- Sandwich tern
- Common tern
- Arctic tern
- Forster's tern
- Least tern
- Sooty tern
- Large-billed tern
- Black tern
- Black skimmer
- Rock pigeon
- Band-tailed pigeon
- Eurasian collared dove
- White-winged dove
- Mourning dove
- Inca dove
- Common ground dove
- Monk parakeet
- Black-billed cuckoo
- Groove-billed ani
- Barn owl
- Eastern screech owl
- Great horned owl
- Snowy owl
- Northern hawk owl
- Burrowing owl
- Barred owl
- Long-eared owl
- Short-eared owl
- Boreal owl
- Northern saw-whet owl
- Common nighthawk
- Chuck-will's-widow
- Whip-poor-will
- Chimney swift
- Ruby-throated hummingbird
- Broad-tailed hummingbird
- Rufous hummingbird
- Allen's hummingbird
- Belted kingfisher
- Red-headed woodpecker
- Red-bellied woodpecker
- Williamson's sapsucker
- Yellow-bellied sapsucker
- Downy woodpecker
- Hairy woodpecker
- Red-cockaded woodpecker
- Black-backed woodpecker
- Northern flicker
- Pileated woodpecker
- Olive-sided flycatcher

=== Amphibians ===

==== Frogs and toads ====
- American toad
- Fowler's toad
- Northern cricket frog
- Bird-voiced treefrog
- Green treefrog
- Cope's grey treefrog
- Eastern grey treefrog
- Spring peeper
- Southern chorus frog
- Illinois chorus frog
- Western chorus frog
- Eastern narrow-mouthed toad
- Eastern spadefoot
- Crawfish frog
- Plains leopard frog
- Bullfrog
- Green frog
- Pickerel frog
- Northern leopard frog
- Southern leopard frog
- Wood frog

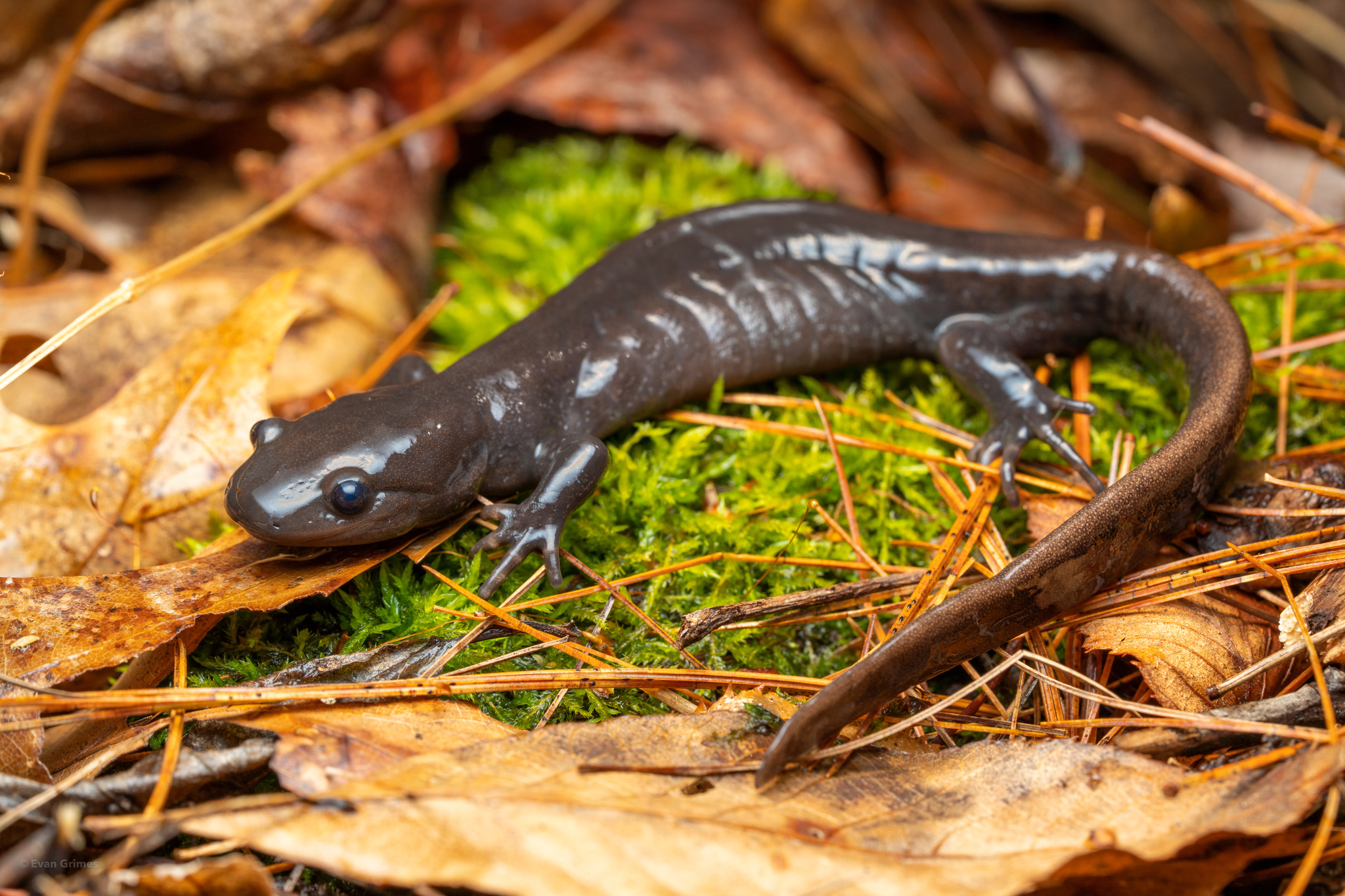

==== Salamanders ====
- Jefferson salamander
- Blue-spotted salamander
- Spotted salamander
- Marbled salamander
- Silvery salamander
- Ambystoma talpoideum
- Small-mouthed salamander
- Tiger salamander
- Hellbender
- Spotted dusky salamander
- Southern two-lined salamander
- Long-tailed salamander
- Cave salamander
- Four-toed salamander
- Eastern red-backed salamander
- Northern zigzag salamander
- Northern slimy salamander
- Mudpuppy
- Eastern newt
- Lesser siren

=== Reptiles ===
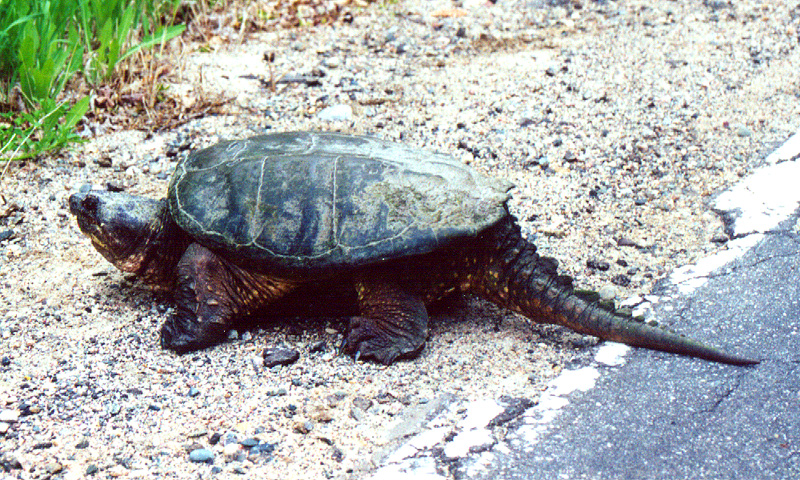

==== Turtles ====
- Snapping turtle
- Alligator snapping turtle
- Painted turtle
- Spotted turtle
- Blanding's turtle
- Map turtle
- Ouachita map turtle
- False map turtle
- River cooter
- Eastern box turtle
- Ornate box turtle
- Pond slider
- Yellow mud turtle
- Eastern mud turtle
- Stinkpot (musk turtle)
- Smooth softshell
- Spiny softshell

==== Lizards ====
- Slender glass lizard
- Collared lizard (possibly introduced)
- Eastern fence lizard
- Common five-lined skink
- Broad-headed skink
- Ground skink
- Six-lined racerunner

==== Snakes ====
- Eastern wormsnake
- Scarletsnake
- Kirtland's snake
- Eastern racer
- Ring-necked snake
- Great Plains ratsnake
- Gray ratsnake
- Eastern foxsnake
- Mud snake
- Western hog-nosed snake
- Eastern hog-nosed snake
- Prairie kingsnake
- Common kingsnake
- Milk snake
- Coachwhip
- Mississippi green watersnake
- Plain-bellied watersnake
- Southern watersnake
- Diamondback watersnake
- Northern watersnake
- Rough greensnake
- Smooth greensnake
- Gophersnake
- Graham's crayfish snake
- Queen snake
- Dekay's brownsnake
- Red-bellied snake
- Flat-headed snake
- Western ribbonsnake
- Plains gartersnake
- Eastern ribbonsnake
- Common garter snake
- Lined snake
- Eastern smooth earthsnake
- Copperhead (venomous)
- Cottonmouth (venomous)
- Timber rattlesnake (venomous)
- Massasauga rattlesnake (venomous)

=== Fish ===
- Bluegill
- Blue catfish
- Bullheads
- Carp
- Channel catfish
- Coho salmon
- Crappie
- Flathead catfish
- Freshwater drum
- Green sunfish
- Buffalo
- Lake sturgeon
- Largemouth bass
- Longnose gar
- Muskellunge
- Northern pike
- Redear sunfish
- Sea lamprey
- Smallmouth bass
- Striped bass
- Sauger
- Walleye
- White bass
- Yellow bass
- Yellow perch

== Insects ==
Over one thousand species of insect can be found in the state of Illinois. These include over five hundred native bees, several types of butterflies, beetles, dragonflies, grasshoppers, and true bugs.

=== Beetles ===
- Acorn weevil
- American carrion beetle
- Meloe americanus
- Dorcus parallelus
- Olla v-nigrum
- Anthrenus coloratus
- Harmonia axyridis
- Neoclytus caprea
- Attagenus fasciatus
- Typocerus velutinus
- Calopteron discrepens
- Cerotoma trifurcata
- Trichiotinus
- Strangalia bicolor
- Big dipper firefly
- Scarites subterraneus
- Epicauta pennsylvanica
- Attagenus
- Calosoma sayi
- Lucidota atra
- Black vine weevil
- Prionus laticollis
- Orthosoma brunneum
- Euphoria inda
- Lichnanthe vulpina
- Burying beetle
- Calligrapha
- Monochamus
- Sandulus
- Oulema melanopus
- Checkered beetle
- Sphenophorus dicolor
- Click beetle
- Rhodobaenus quinquepunctatus
- Leptinotarsa decemlineata
- Hippodamia convergens
- Plectrodera scalator
- Chrysomela scripta
- Limonius
- Trigonopeltastes delta
- Chrysochus auratus
- Drugstore beetle
- Dichotomius
- Bolbocerasoma
- Alaus oculatus
- Eastern Hercules beetle
- Epitrix fuscula
- Desmocerus palliatus
- Emerald ash borer
- Carabus nemoralis
- Galerita
- False potato beetle
- Cicindela scutellaris
- Calosoma scrutator
- Anatis labiculata
- Dendroides
- Firefly
- Graphisurus fasciatus
- Acmaeodera pulchella
- Stenelytrana emarginata
- Strangalia famelica
- Strangalia luteicornis
- Glischrochilus quadrisignatus
- Fungus weevil
- Lucanus elaphus
- Glowworm
- Ontholestes cingulatus
- Dictyoptera aurora
- Charidotella sexpunctata
- Cotalpa lanigera
- Pelidnota punctata
- Green June beetle
- Ground beetle
- Hairy rove beetle
- Osmoderma eremicola
- Odontotaenuis disjunctus
- Eburia quadrigeminata
- Japanese beetle
- Jewel beetle
- Dermestes lardarius
- Platydracus cinnamopterus
- Platydracus maculosus
- Saperda vestita
- Megacyllene robiniae
- Odontota dorsalis
- Arthromacra aenea
- Longhorn beetle
- Sitophilus zeamis
- Epicauta funebris
- Nicrophorus mariginatus
- Chauliognathus marginatus
- Scirtes orbiculatus
- Phyllophaga lanceolata
- Cryptolaemus montrouzieri
- Chalcophora fortis
- Hoplia
- Deloyala guttata
- Diabrotica barberi
- Northeastern pine sawyer
- Diabrotica barberi
- Typocerus sinuatus
- Dicaelus purpuratus
- Curculio
- Arrhenodes minutus
- Saperda imitans
- Oil beetle
- Apterodela unipuncata
- Polydrusus impressifrons
- Systena blanda
- Pennsylvania firefly
- Chauliognathus pensylvanicus
- Disonycha glabrata
- Pleasing fungus beetle
- Plum curculio
- Saperda calcarata
- Cybister fimbriolatus
- Acilius mediatus
- Nicrophorus pustulatus
- Lixus scrobicollis
- Tarpela micans
- Phanaeus vindex
- Cucujus clavipes
- Red milkweed beetle
- Enaphalodes rufulus
- Neoclytus acuminatus
- Epicauta atrata
- Buprestis rufipes
- Necrodes surimanensis
- Ptosima gibbicollis
- Calopteron reticulatum
- Rhinoceros beetle
- Sitophilus oryzae
- Rose chafer
- Saperda candida
- Clytus ruricola
- Megacyllene antennata
- Xylotrechus colonus
- Scarites
- Scarlet lily beetle
- Malachius aeneus
- Chalcophora virginiensis
- Stenolophus
- Seven-spotted lady beetle
- Anomala
- Anomala binotata
- Asphaera lustrans
- Hyperaspis signata
- Neolema sexpunctata
- Six-spotted tiger beetle
- Soft-winged flower beetle
- Soldier beetle
- Podabrus pruinosis
- Silis
- Chalcophora georgiana
- Elaphidion mucronatum
- Diabrotica undecimpunctata howardi
- Coleomegilla maculata lengi
- Synaphaeta guexi
- Epilachna borealis
- Stag beetle
- Strawberry root weevil
- Harpalus rufipes
- Acalymma vittatum
- Labidomera clivicollis
- Cylas formicarius
- Ten-lined June beetle
- Thistle tortoise beetle
- Hoplia trifasciata
- Lema trivittata
- Lema trilinea
- Nicrophorus tomentosus
- Tumbling flower beetle
- Chilocorus stigma
- Anelaphus villosus
- Atalantycha bilineata
- Pseudocneorhinus bifasciatus
- Varied carpet beetle
- Polyphylla variolosa
- Carabus vietinghoffii
- Chlaenius
- Water penny
- Hydrochara
- Ripiphorus fasciatus
- Whirligigs
- Goes tigrinus
- Monochamus scutellatus
- Tenebrio molitor

=== Bees, wasps, hornets, and ants ===
- Agapostemon
- American bumble bee
- Melecta pacifica
- Ant
- Augochlora pura
- Bald-faced hornet
- Agapostemon viriscens
- Black and yellow mud dauber
- Black carpenter ant
- Blue-winged wasp
- Braconid wasp
- Braconid wasp
- Bombus griseocollis
- Carpenter ant
- Cicada killer
- Aelia americana
- Polistes rubiginosus
- Chalybion californicum
- Common eastern bumble bee
- Polistes exclamans
- Cow killer
- Cuckoo bee
- Cuckoo wasp
- Macremphytus tarsatus
- Double-banded scoliid wasp
- Euglossa dilemma
- Eastern carpenter bee
- Eastern yellowjacket
- Elm sawfly
- European hornet
- European paper wasp
- Anthidium manicatum
- Camponotus chromaiodes
- Polistes carolina
- Five-banded thynnid wasp
- Dasymutilla quadriguttata
- Four-toothed mason wasp
- Halictus
- Giant ichneumon wasp
- Megarhyssa atrata
- Megarhyssa macrurus
- Megarhyssa nortoni
- Gold-marked thread-waisted wasp
- Golden northern bumble bee
- Great black wasp
- Great golden digger wasp
- Honey bee
- Horntail wasp
- Taeniogonalos gundlachii
- Acrotaphus wiltii
- Diradops bethunei
- Mesostenus
- Odontocolon
- Protichneumon
- Trogus
- Megachile
- long-horned bee
- Mason bee
- Polistes metricus
- Miner bee
- Bombus fervidus
- Polistes fuscatus
- Megarhyssa nortoni
- Orange-legged furrow bee
- Paper wasp
- Dianthidium
- Pigeon tremex
- Pipe organ mud dauber
- Potter wasp
- Red paper wasp
- Tetramorium caespitum
- Ringed paper wasp
- Sand wasp
- Sawfly
- Scoliid wasp
- Ophion
- Small carpenter bee
- Southern yellowjacket
- Auplopus
- Entypus
- Priocnemis
- Chlorion aerarium
- Prionyx
- Sphex lucae
- Bombus ternarius
- Two-spotted longhorn bee
- Velvet ant
- Cerceris
- Yellow jacket

=== Butterflies and moths ===
- Eumorpha achemon
- Leucania adjuta
- Afflicted dagger moth
- Ailanthus webworm moth
- Autographa californica
- Ambiguous moth
- Dypterygia rozmani
- American copper
- American dagger moth
- American dun-bar moth
- American idia
- Vanessa virginiensis
- American lappet moth
- Peridea angulosa
- Angus's datana moth
- Speyeria aphrodite
- Arched hooktip
- Adoxophyes furcatana
- Arcigera flower moth
- Arge moth
- Army cutworm moth
- Armyworm moth
- Ash sphinx
- Papaipema furcata
- Speyeria atlantis
- Bagworm moth
- Baltimore checkerspot
- Hypena baltimoralis
- Banded hairstreak
- Eumorpha fasciatus
- Banded tussock moth
- Barberry geometer moth
- Bent-line carpet moth
- Bent-line dart
- Bent-line gray moth
- Lithophane bethunei
- Pyrausta bicoloralis
- Bicolored sallow
- Epiblema otiosana
- Megalographa biloba
- Black bit moth
- Black swallowtail
- Black-and-yellow lichen moth
- Black-barred brown
- Black-bordered lemon
- Black-waved flannel moth
- Blackberry looper
- Blinded sphinx moth
- Bluish spring moth
- Bold medicine moth
- Bold-feathered grass moth
- Boxwood leaftier moth
- Lacinipolia renigera
- Thyraylia nana
- Phlogophora periculosa
- Brown bark carpet moth
- Brown panopoda moth
- Brown-hooded owlet
- Buck moth
- Cabbage White Butterfly
- Calyptra canadensis
- Canadian Sphinx
- Peoria approximella
- Sitochroa palealis
- Catalpa Sphinx
- Celery Looper Moth
- Celypha cespitana
- Fissicrambus mutabilis
- Checkered White
- Rheumaptera prunivorata
- Chickweed Geometer
- Psaphida electilis
- Cinnabar Moth
- Acrolophus popeanella
- Colocasia propinquilinea
- Clouded Skipper
- Clouded Sulphur
- Phoebis sennae
- Hypsopygia costalis
- Caenurgina crassiuscula
- Haploa clymene
- Zale minerea
- Macaria aemulataria
- Common Checkered-Skipper
- Common Gray
- Common Oak Moth
- Coenonympha tullia
- Amblyscirtes vialis
- Pholisora catullus
- Common Spragueia
- Common Spring Moth
- Pleuroprucha insulsaria
- Common Wood-Nymph
- Nymphalis l-album
- Eusarca confusaria
- Copper Underwing
- Coral Hairstreak Butterfly
- Crambid Snout Moth
- Crambid Snout Moth
- Evergestis rimosalis
- Crowned Slug Moth
- Macaria ribearia
- Eutrapela clemataria
- Marathyssa inficita
- Ecliptopera atricolorata
- Dark-headed Aspen Leafroller Moth
- Pangrapta decoralis
- Definite Tussock Moth
- Delicate Cycnia
- Diasemiodes janassialis
- Idaea scintillularia
- Tosale oviplagalis
- Epipaschia superatalis
- Discolored Renia Moth
- Distinct Quaker Moth
- Dogwood Borer
- Euthyatira pudens
- Artace cribrarius
- Glena cribrataria
- Lochmaeus bilineata
- Scoparia biplagialis
- Nerice bidentata
- Baileya doubledayi
- Misogada unicolor
- Dreamy Duskywing
- Dun Skipper
- Eastern Comma
- Malacosoma americanum
- Eastern Tiger Swallowtail
- Cupido comyntas
- Alypia octomaculata
- Achatodes zeae
- Elm Sphinx
- Everlasting Tebenna Moth
- Lethe eurydice
- Paectes oculatrix
- Faint-spotted Angle Moth
- Falcate Orangetip
- Spodoptera frugiperda
- Fall Webworm
- False Crocus Geometer
- Allotria elonympha
- Plagodis fervidaria
- Fiery Skipper
- Acronicta dactylina
- Orgyia detrita
- Five-spotted Hawk Moth
- Flowing-line Hypena Moth
- Caenurgina erechtea
- Forest Tent Caterpillar Moth
- Aethalura intertexta
- Four-spotted Ghost Moth
- Gluphisia avimacula
- Palpita quadristigmalis
- Probole amicaria
- Archips argyrospila
- Hyles gallii
- Garden Webworm Moth
- Garman's Quaker
- Uresiphita reversalis
- Elaphria georgei
- Giant Leopard Moth
- Papilio cresphontes
- Anaea andria
- Basilodes pepita
- Cucullia asteroides
- Cirrhophanus triangulifer
- Granite Moth
- Grape Leaffolder
- Grape Plume Moth
- Harrisina americana
- Psychomorpha epimenis
- Agriphila
- Lycaena dione
- Strymon melinus
- Gray Scoopwing Moth
- Gray Spring Moth
- Hypena madefactalis
- Dasylophia thyatiroides
- Great Spangled Fritillary
- Greater Grapevine Looper
- Green Arches
- Green Cloverworm Moth
- Gypsy Moth
- Hackberry Emperor
- Hag Moth
- Harnessed Tiger Moth
- Herald Moth
- Hickory Hairstreak
- Hickory Tussock Moth
- Himmelman's Plume Moth
- Honey Locust Moth
- Horace's Duskywing
- Ilia Underwing
- Imperial Moth
- Indianmeal Moth
- Io Moth
- Ipsilon Dart Moth
- Juvenal's Duskywing
- Laurel Sphinx
- Least Skipper
- Leconte's Haploa
- Lesser Maple Spanworm Moth
- Lettered Sphinx
- Luna Moth
- Lunate Zale Moth
- Meal Moth
- Melonworm Moth
- Milkweed Tussock Moth
- Monarch Butterfly
- Moonseed Moth
- Morbid Owlet Moth
- Morning-glory Plume Moth
- Nais Tiger Moth
- Nason's Slug
- Northern Pearly-eye
- Oak Besma
- Oak Leafroller
- Obtuse Euchlaena Moth
- Oldwife Underwing
- Orange Sulphur
- Orange-patched Smoky Moth
- Oval Abrostola Moth
- Pale Beauty
- Parthenice Tiger Moth
- Peck's Skipper
- Phyllira Tiger Moth
- Pink-spotted Hawkmoth
- Pipevine Swallowtail
- Plume Moth
- Polyphemus Moth
- Promethea Moth
- Question Mark Butterfly
- Red-headed Inchworm Moth
- Regal Moth
- Retarded Dagger Moth
- Reversed Haploa Moth
- Rose Hooktip Moth
- Rosy Maple Moth
- Ruddy Dagger Moth
- Rustic Quaker
- Saddleback Caterpillar Moth
- Salt Marsh Moth
- Satin Moth
- Saw-wing Moth
- Schlaeger's Fruitworm Moth
- Semirelict Underwing
- Shagreened Slug Moth
- Silver-spotted Skipper
- Skiff Moth
- Small Necklace Moth
- Smeared Dagger Moth
- Snowy-shouldered Acleris Moth
- Sorghum Webworm Moth
- Southern Flannel Moth
- Southern Longhorn Moth
- Spiny Oakworm Moth
- Splendid Dagger Moth
- Spotted Apatelodes
- Spotted Grass Moth
- Spotted Tussock Moth
- Spring Azure
- Spun Glass Slug Moth
- Summer Azure
- Sycamore Tussock Moth
- The Beggar
- The Gem
- The Joker
- The Scribbler
- Thin-lined Owlet Moth
- Three-lined Flower Moth
- Venerable Dart Moth
- Viceroy
- Virginian Tiger Moth
- White Admiral Butterfly
- White Flannel Moth
- White Spring Moth
- White-dotted Prominent
- White-marked Tussock Moth
- Yehl Skipper
- Yellow-based Tussock Moth
- Yellow-collared Scape Moth
- Yellow-collared Slug Moth
- Yellow-fringed Dolichomia
- Yellow-haired Dagger Moth
- Yellow-lined Owlet
- Yellow-vested Moth
- Yucca Moth
- Zabulon Skipper
- Zebra Conchylodes Moth
- Zebra Swallowtail

=== Cicadas and Planthoppers ===
- Broad-headed Sharpshooter
- Buffalo Treehopper
- Bush Cicada
- Candy-striped Leafhopper
- Cicada
- Citrus Flatid Planthopper
- Coppery Leafhopper
- Dog Day Cicada
- Dogwood Spittlebug
- Flatid Planthopper
- Johnsongrass Sharpshooter
- Keeled Treehopper
- Leafhopper - subgenus cloanthanus
- Leafhopper nymph (juvenile)
- Meadow Spittlebug
- Northern Flatid Planthopper
- Oak Treehopper
- Periodical Cicada
- Planthopper
- Robinson's Annual Cicada
- Scissor Grinder Cicada
- Sharpshooter
- Speckled Sharpshooter
- Swamp Cicada
- Three-banded Leafhopper
- Treehopper
- Two-marked Treehopper
- Typical Leafhopper
- Versute Sharpshooter
- Wide-footed Treehopper
- Yellow-striped Sharpshooter

=== Grasshoppers and Crickets ===
- Bird Grasshopper
- Bush Katydid
- Camel Cricket
- Carolina Leaf-roller Cricket
- Carolina Locust
- Common Coneheads
- Common Meadow Katydid
- Differential Grasshopper
- Eastern Shieldback Katydid
- Field Cricket
- Fork-tailed Bush Katydid
- Grasshopper Nymphs
- Greater Angle-wing Katydid
- Grizzly Locust
- House Cricket
- Katydid
- Lesser Meadow Katydid
- Mischievous Bird Grasshopper
- Northern Green-striped Grasshopper
- Northern Mole Cricket
- Red-headed Bush Cricket
- Red-legged Grasshopper
- Restless Bush Cricket
- Round-tipped Conehead
- Slender Meadow Katydid
- Snowy Tree Cricket
- Spotted Camel Cricket
- Spur-throated Grasshopper
- Straight-lanced Meadow Katydid
- True Katydid
- Two-spotted Tree Cricket
- Two-striped Grasshopper

=== Dragonflies ===
- Autumn Meadowhawk
- Azure Bluet
- Banded Pennant
- Blue Dasher
- Common Green Darner
- Common Sanddragon
- Double-striped Bluet
- Dragonhunter
- Eastern Amberwing
- Eastern Pondhawk
- Ebony Jewelwing
- Familiar Bluet
- Fragile Forktail
- Great Blue Skimmer
- Halloween Pennant
- Meadowhawk
- Red Saddlebags
- Shadow Darner
- Slaty Skimmer
- Spangled Skimmer
- Spot-winged Glider
- Stream Bluet
- Twelve-spotted Skimmer
- Wandering Glider
- Widow Skimmer

=== True Bugs ===
- Ambush Bug
- Aphids
- Aphids
- Assassin Bug
- Zelus luridus
- Pselliopus cinctus
- Backswimmer
- Bed Bug
- Brown Marmorated Stink Bug
- False Chinch Bug
- Flat Bug
- Giant Water Bug
- Harlequin Bug
- Lace Bug
- Large Milkweed Bug
- Terminalis
- Oppositus
- Milkweed Assassin Bug
- Plant Bug
- Scentless Plant Bug
- Spined Soldier Bug
- Squash Bug
- Stink Bug
- Stinkbug
- Toad Bug
- Two-lined Spittlebug
- Two-spotted Stink Bug
- Water Strider
- Western Conifer Seed Bug
- Wheel Bug
- Whitefly
