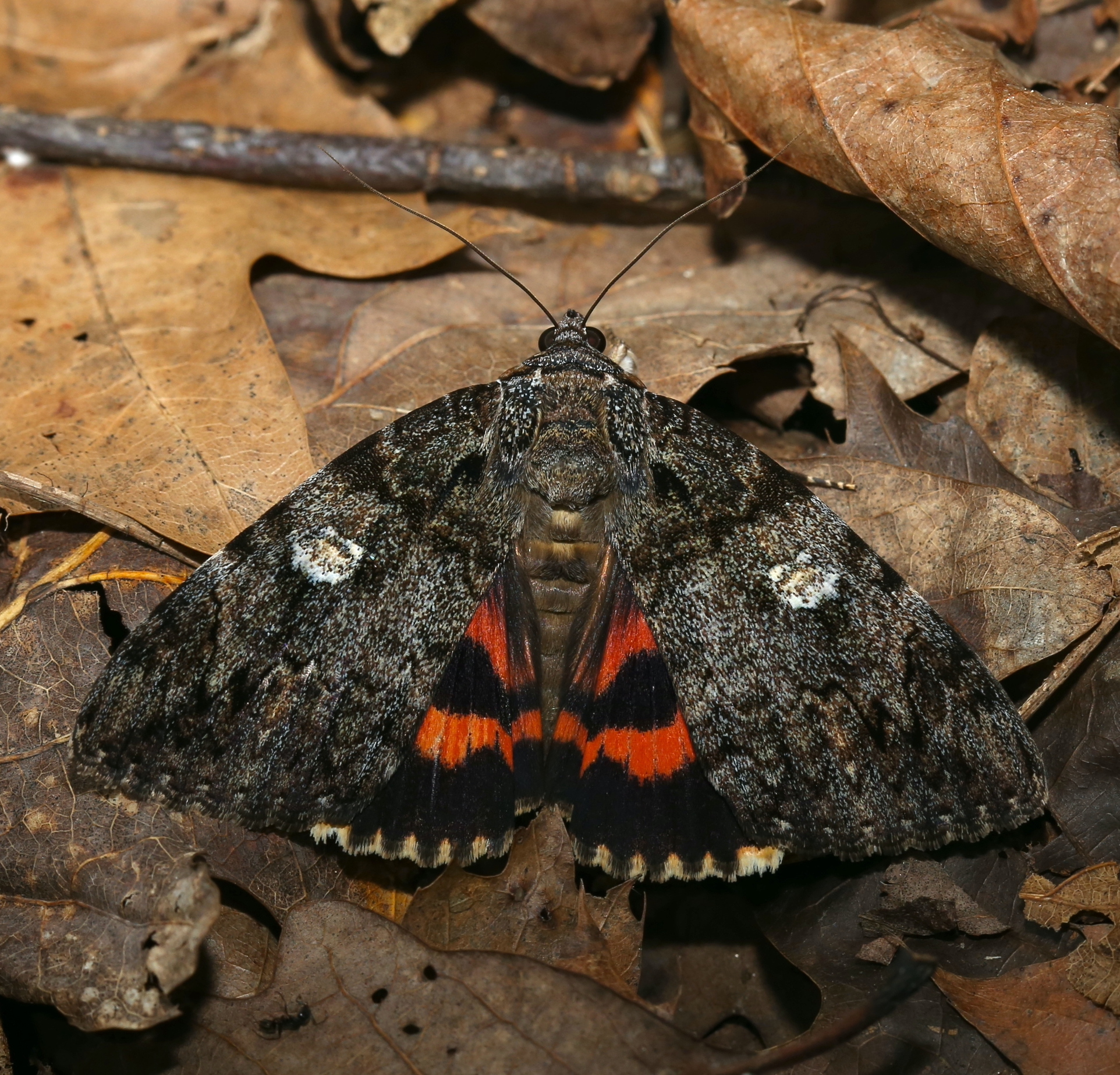
- Adult
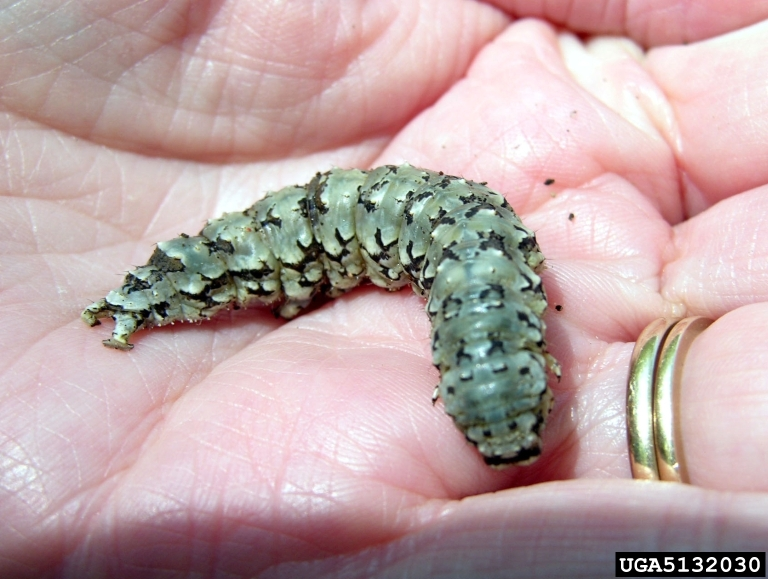
- Larva

Scientific classification
- Kingdom: Animalia
- Phylum: Arthropoda
- Class: Insecta
- Order: Lepidoptera
- Superfamily: Noctuoidea
- Family: Erebidae
- Genus: Catocala
- Species: C. ilia

Binomial name
- Catocala ilia (Cramer, 1776)

Synonyms
- Phalaena ilia Cramer, [1776]; Catocala duplicata Worthington, 1883; Ephesia duplicata; Catocala decorata Worthington, 1883; Catocala conspicua Worthington, 1883; Catocala uxor Guenée, 1852; Catocala albomacula Butler, 1892; Catocala iliana Strand, 1914; Catocala obsoleta Worthington, 1883; Catocala confusa Worthington, 1883; Catocala normani Bartsch, 1916; Catocala santanas Reiff, 1920; Catocala hulsti Reiff, 1920; Catocala zoe Behr, 1870; Catocala osculata Hulst, 1884; Catocala reiffi Cassino, 1917

= Catocala ilia =

Species of moth

Catocala ilia, the Ilia underwing, beloved underwing or wife underwing, is a moth of the family Erebidae. The species was first described by Pieter Cramer in 1776. It can be found in the eastern part of the United States as well as southern Canada. Subspecies Catocala ilia zoe can be found in California and Arizona.

The wingspan is 65–82 mm. A spot on its forewing with a distinct white circle which encompasses it distinguishes this moth from others in the same family. Otherwise, the forewing can be extremely variable. The underwing that it is named for can range in color from light orange to a deep red. The moths flies from June to September depending on the location.

The larvae feed on oak, including black, burr, red, and white oaks.

== Subspecies ==
- Catocala ilia ilia
- Catocala ilia zoe Behr, 1870 (California, Arizona)
