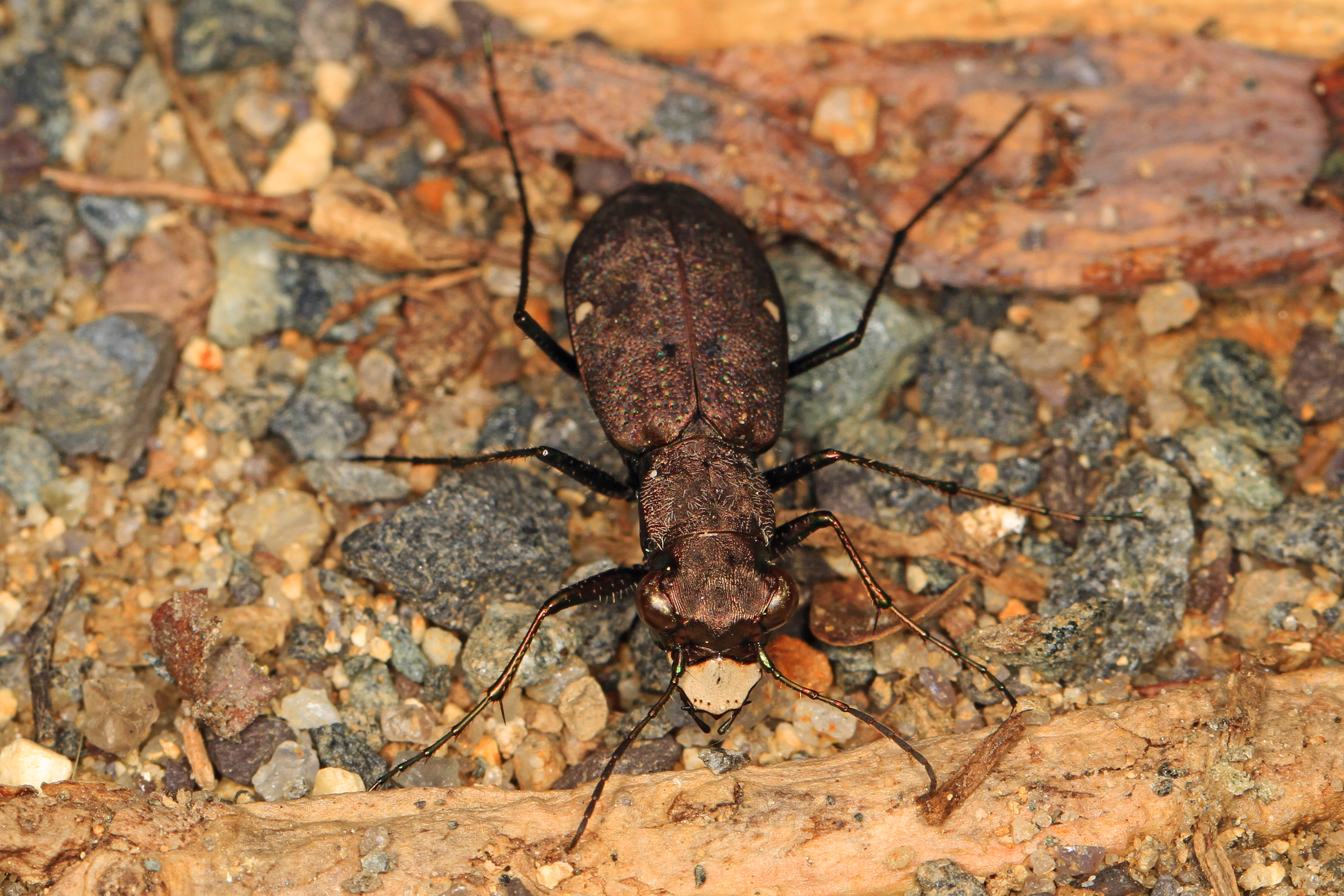
- One-spotted tiger beetle, Apterodela unipunctata, Virginia

Scientific classification
- Domain: Eukaryota
- Kingdom: Animalia
- Phylum: Arthropoda
- Class: Insecta
- Order: Coleoptera
- Suborder: Adephaga
- Family: Cicindelidae
- Genus: Apterodela
- Species: A. unipunctata

Binomial name
- Apterodela unipunctata (Fabricius, 1775)

Synonyms
- Cylindera unipunctata (Fabricius, 1775); Cicindela unipunctata Fabricius, 1775

= Apterodela unipunctata =

Species of beetle

Apterodela unipunctata, the one-spotted tiger beetle, is a species of flashy tiger beetle in the family Cicindelidae. It is found in North America. This species was formerly in the genus Cylindera. It has a Nearctic distribution and lives in open forest and leaf litter. It is believed to be the sister taxon to Apterodela ovipennis.

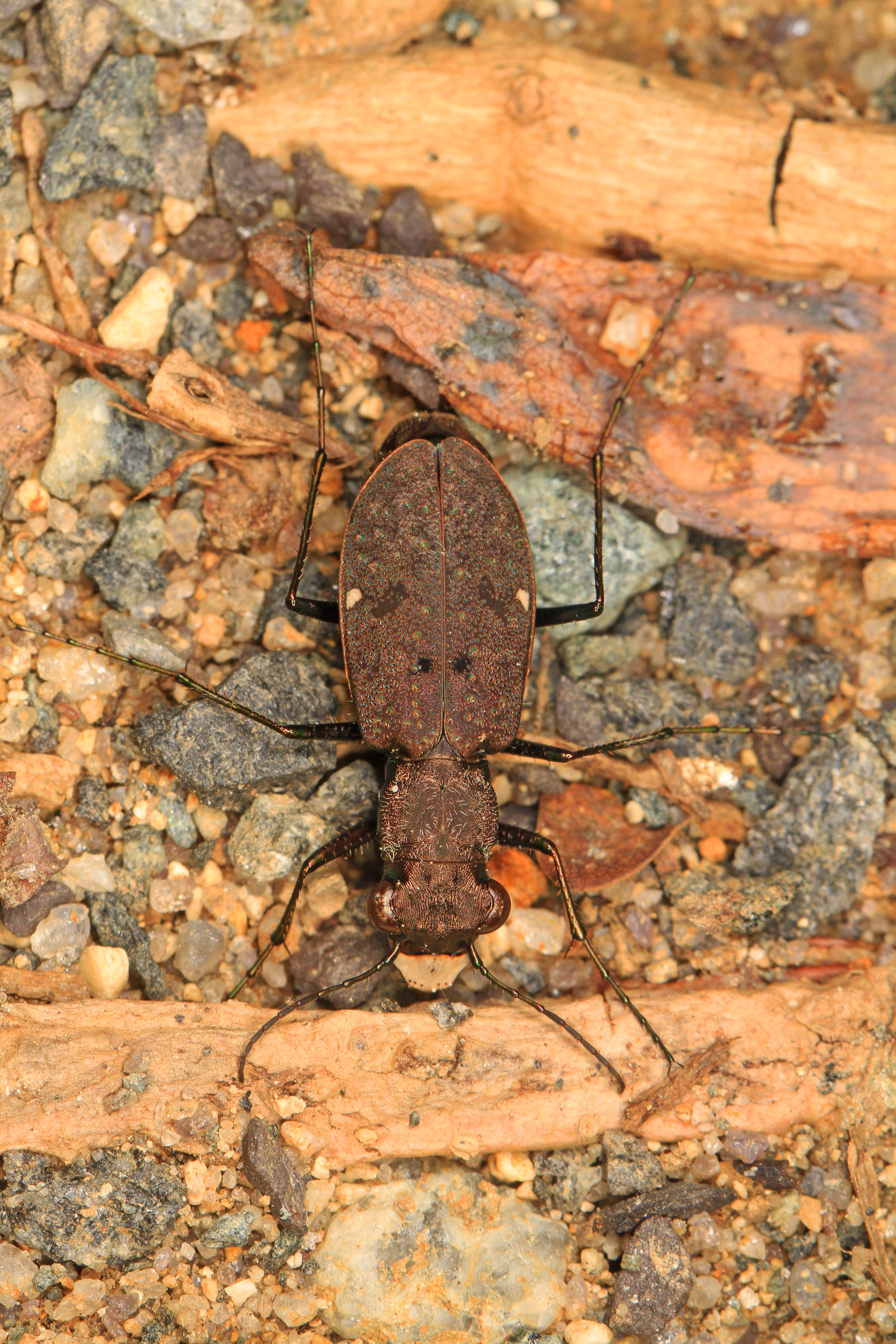
One-spotted tiger beetle, Apterodela unipunctata, Virginia
