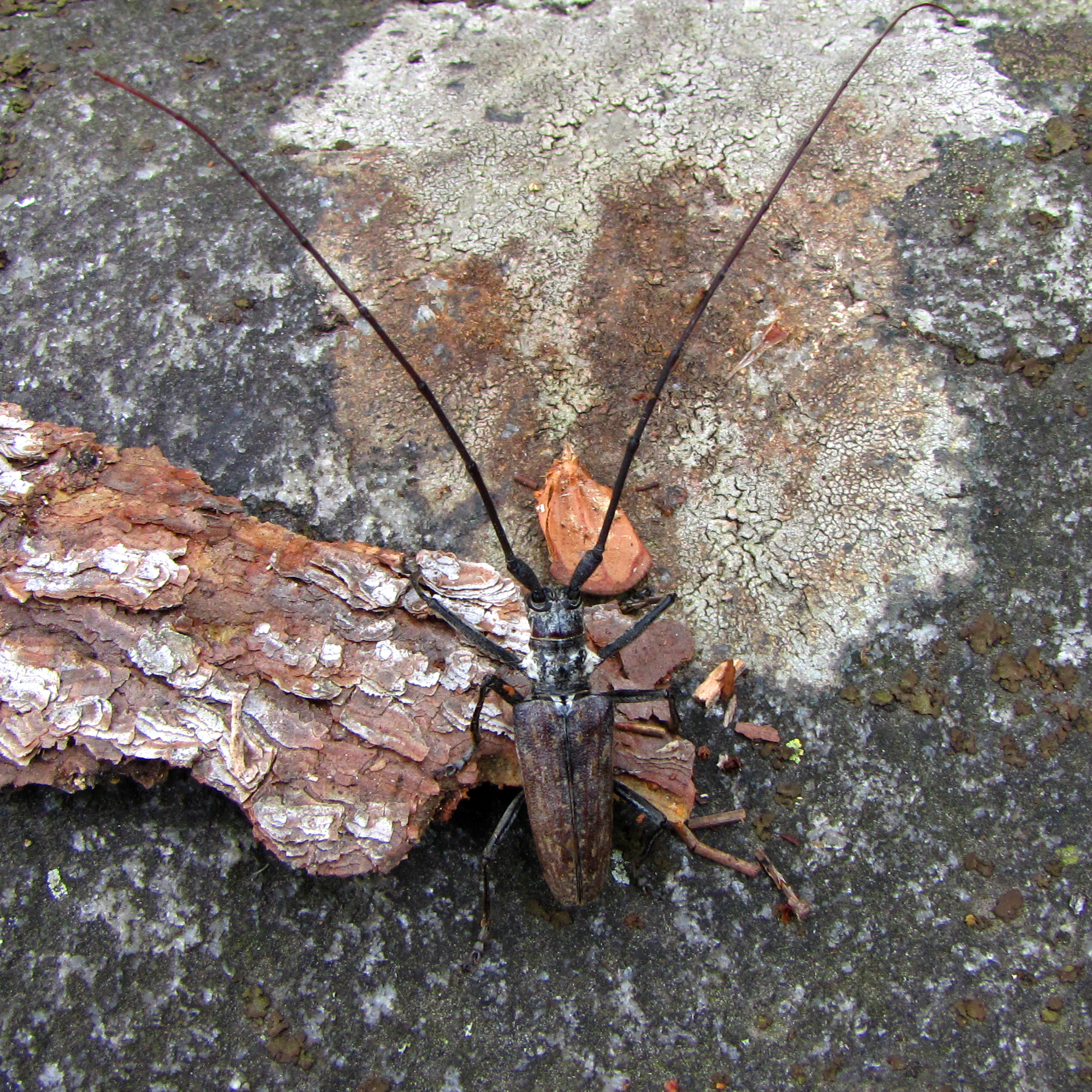

Scientific classification
- Domain: Eukaryota
- Kingdom: Animalia
- Phylum: Arthropoda
- Class: Insecta
- Order: Coleoptera
- Suborder: Polyphaga
- Infraorder: Cucujiformia
- Family: Cerambycidae
- Tribe: Lamiini
- Genus: Monochamus
- Species: M. notatus

Binomial name
- Monochamus notatus (Drury, 1773)

Synonyms
- Cerambyx notatus Drury, 1773; Monochamus confusor Kirby, 1837; Monohammus confusor (Kirby) LeConte, 1852

= Monochamus notatus =

Species of beetle

Monochamus notatus, the northeastern pine sawyer or notable sawyer, is a species of beetle in the family Cerambycidae. It was described by Dru Drury in 1773, originally under the genus Cerambyx. It is known from Canada and the United States.

The species is native to North America.
