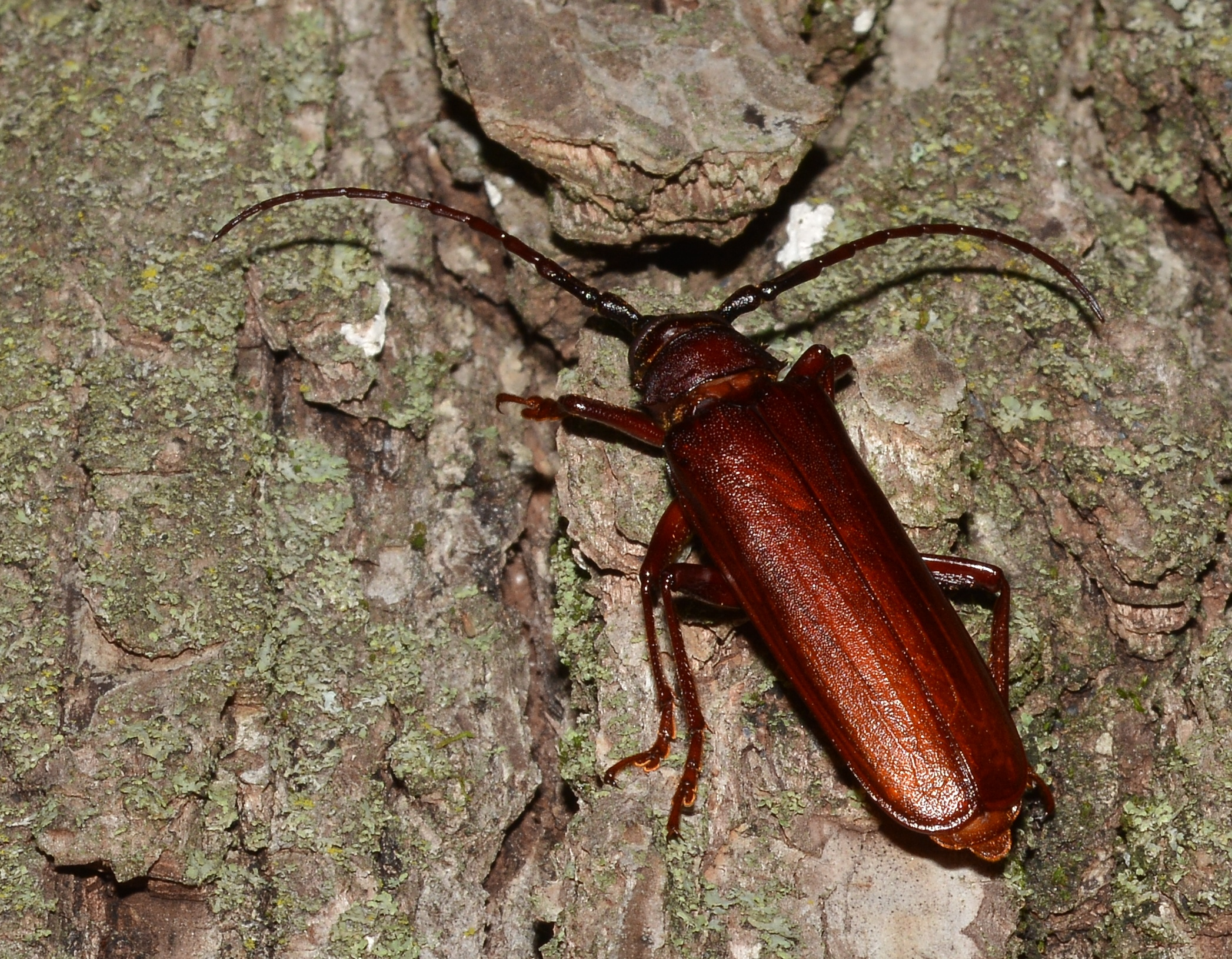

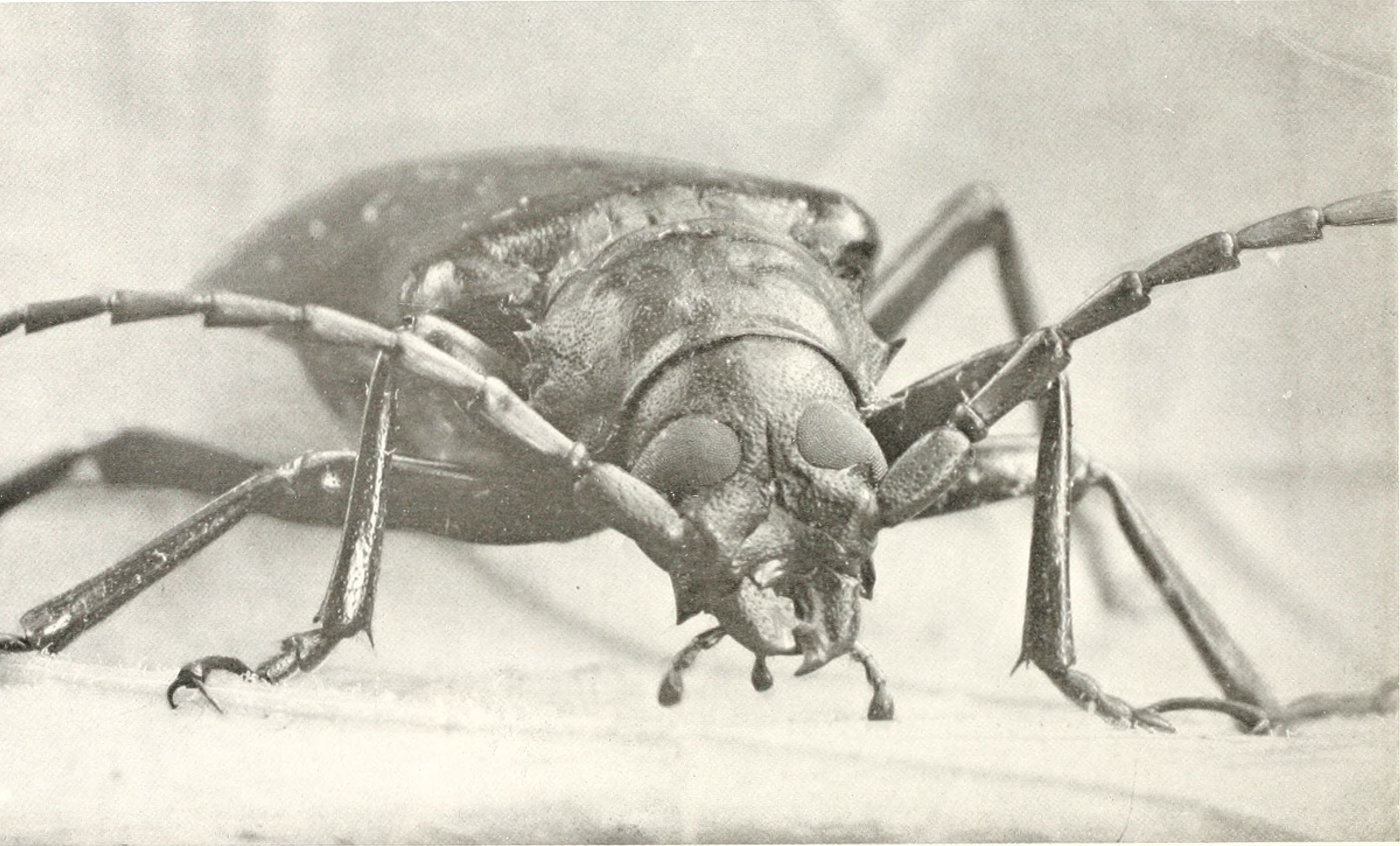

Scientific classification
- Kingdom: Animalia
- Phylum: Arthropoda
- Clade: Pancrustacea
- Class: Insecta
- Order: Coleoptera
- Suborder: Polyphaga
- Infraorder: Cucujiformia
- Family: Cerambycidae
- Subfamily: Prioninae
- Tribe: Prionini
- Genus: Orthosoma; Drapiez, 1842
- Species: O. brunneum

Binomial name
- Orthosoma brunneum (Forster, 1771)

Synonyms
- (Genus): Orthosomus Drapiez 1842; (Species) List: Orthosoma amplians Casey, 1912; Orthosoma cylindricus (Fabricius, 1781); Orthosoma cylindroides (Gmelin, 1790); Orthosoma pennsylvanicus (De Geer, 1775); Orthosoma spadix Casey, 1912; Orthosoma sulcatus (Olivier, 1795); Orthosoma unicolor (Drury, 1773); Cerambyx brunneus Forster, 1771; Cerambyx brunnus Gmelin, 1790; Cerambyx cylindroides Gmelin, 1790; Cerambyx pennsylvanicus Degeer, 1775; Cerambyx unicolor Drury, 1773; Lamia brunnea Olivier, 1792; Prionus cylindricus Fabricius, 1781

= Orthosoma =

Orthosoma brunneum

Genus of beetles

Orthosoma is a genus of beetles in the family Cerambycidae. It is monotypic, being represented by the single species Orthosoma brunneum. The genus name Orthosoma was also previously used for a microsporidian genus. As the name is pre-occupied by this beetle genus, the name for the microsporidian has been changed to Orthosomella.

== Description ==
Orthosoma brunneum has several spikes on their pronotum, characteristic of the genus.

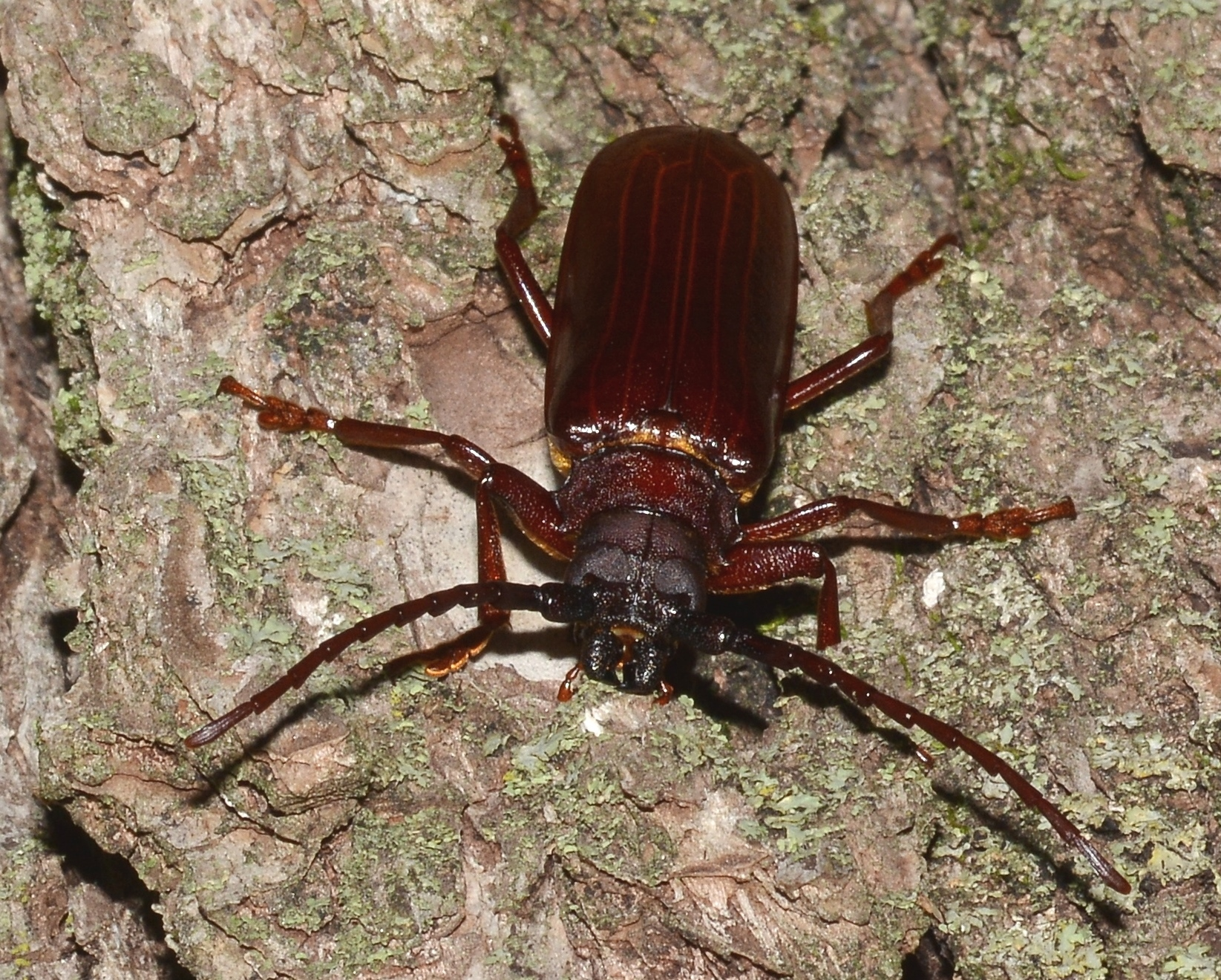
Front view

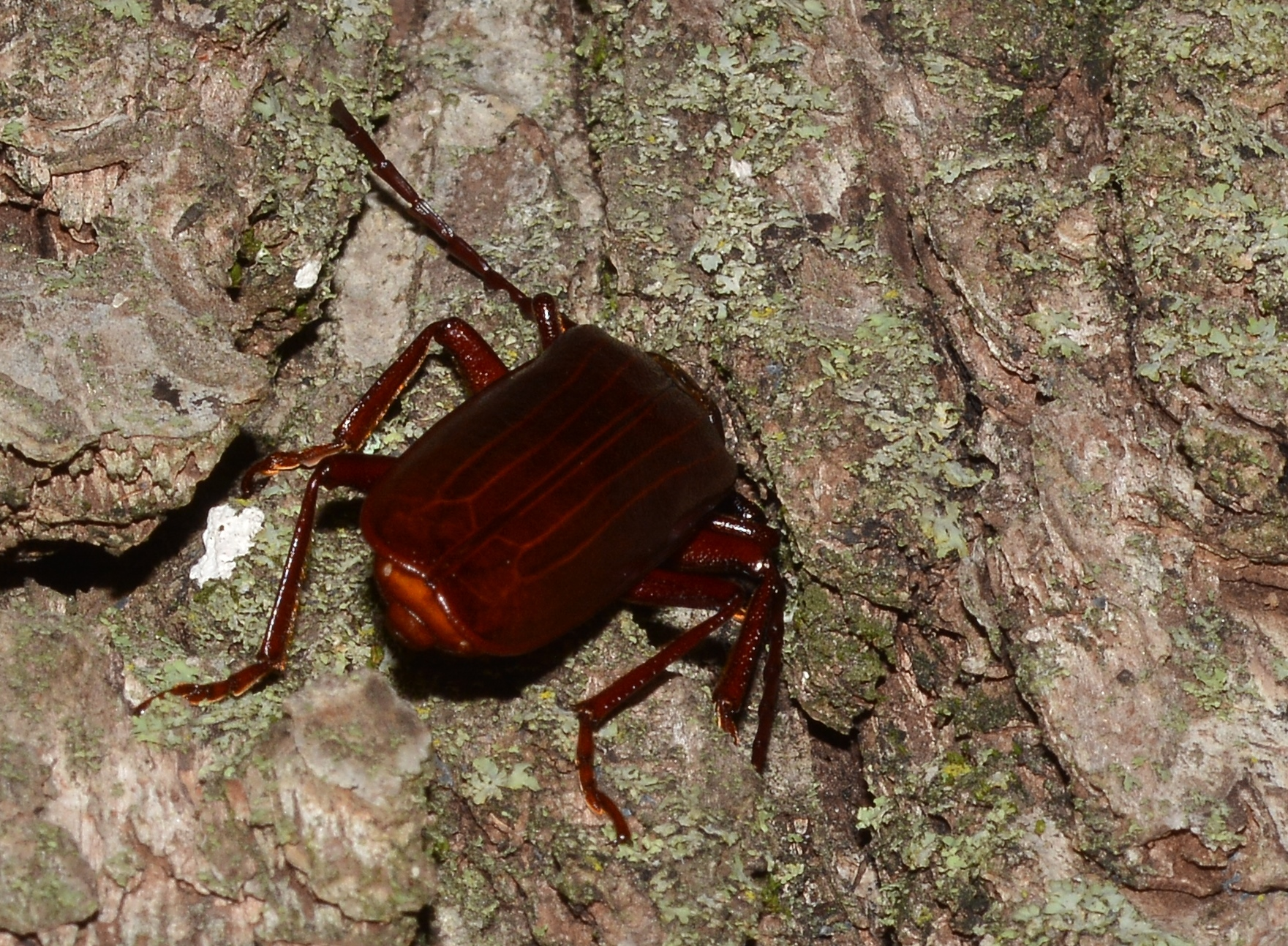
Rear view
