= Oak leafroller =

Oak leafroller (or oak leaf roller) can refer to several species of moth that feed on leaves and roll them for nests:

In Europe

- Tortrix viridana, commonly known as the European oak leafroller or green oak moth

In North America

- Archips semiferanus, commonly known as the oak leafroller in eastern North America
- Choristoneura fractivittana, Canada and the eastern United States
