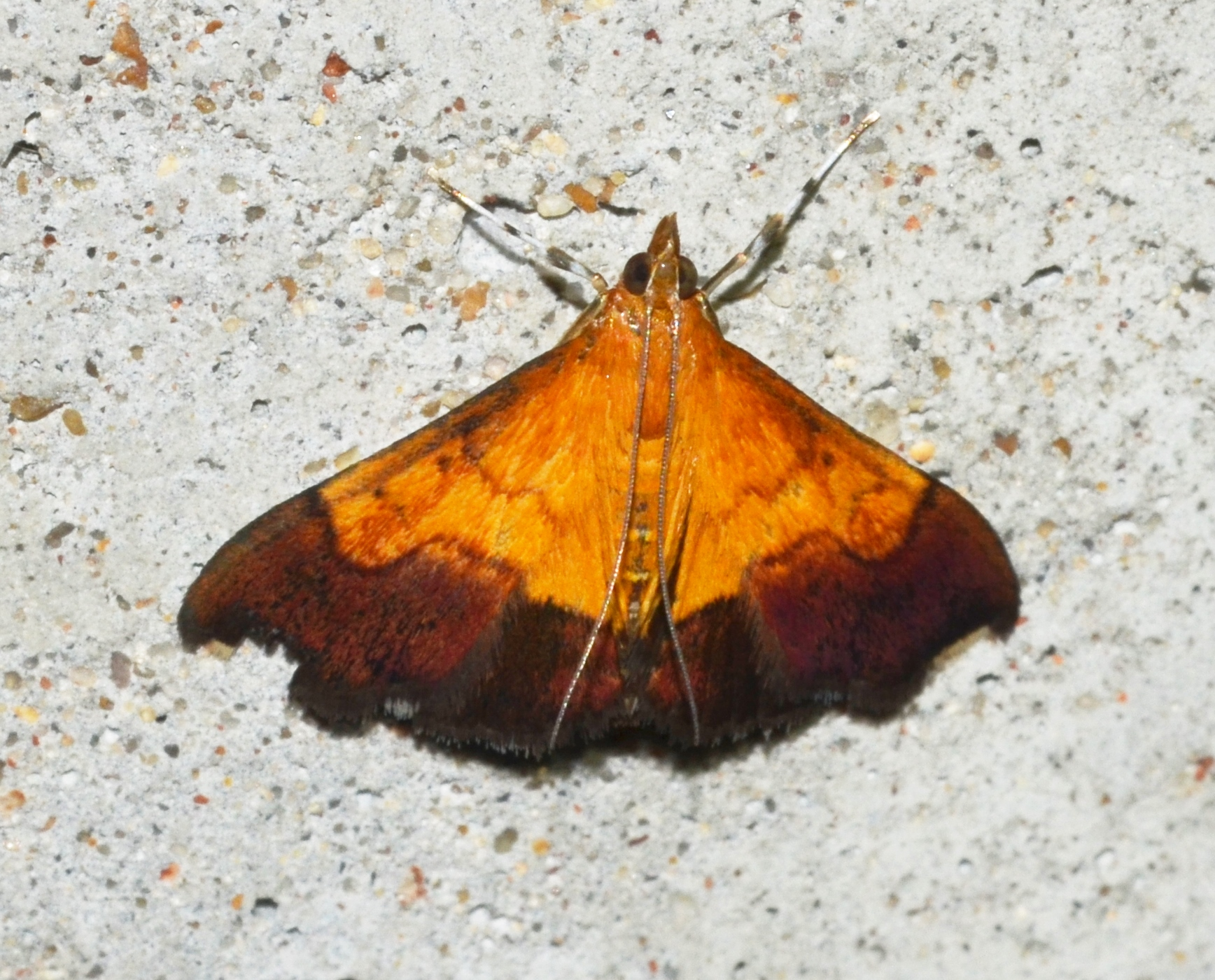

Scientific classification
- Kingdom: Animalia
- Phylum: Arthropoda
- Class: Insecta
- Order: Lepidoptera
- Family: Crambidae
- Genus: Pyrausta
- Species: P. bicoloralis

Binomial name
- Pyrausta bicoloralis (Guenée, 1854)

Synonyms
- Asopia bicoloralis Guenée, 1854; Endotricha julialis Walker, 1859; Cindaphia incensalis Lederer, 1863

= Pyrausta bicoloralis =

Species of moth

Pyrausta bicoloralis, the bicolored pyrausta moth, is a moth in the family Crambidae. It was described by Achille Guenée in 1854. It is found in North America, where it has been recorded from Nova Scotia south to Florida, west to Michigan and Texas. In the south, the range extends to South America.

The wingspan is 14–19 mm. Adults have a yellow and purple pattern. They are on wing from June to September.
