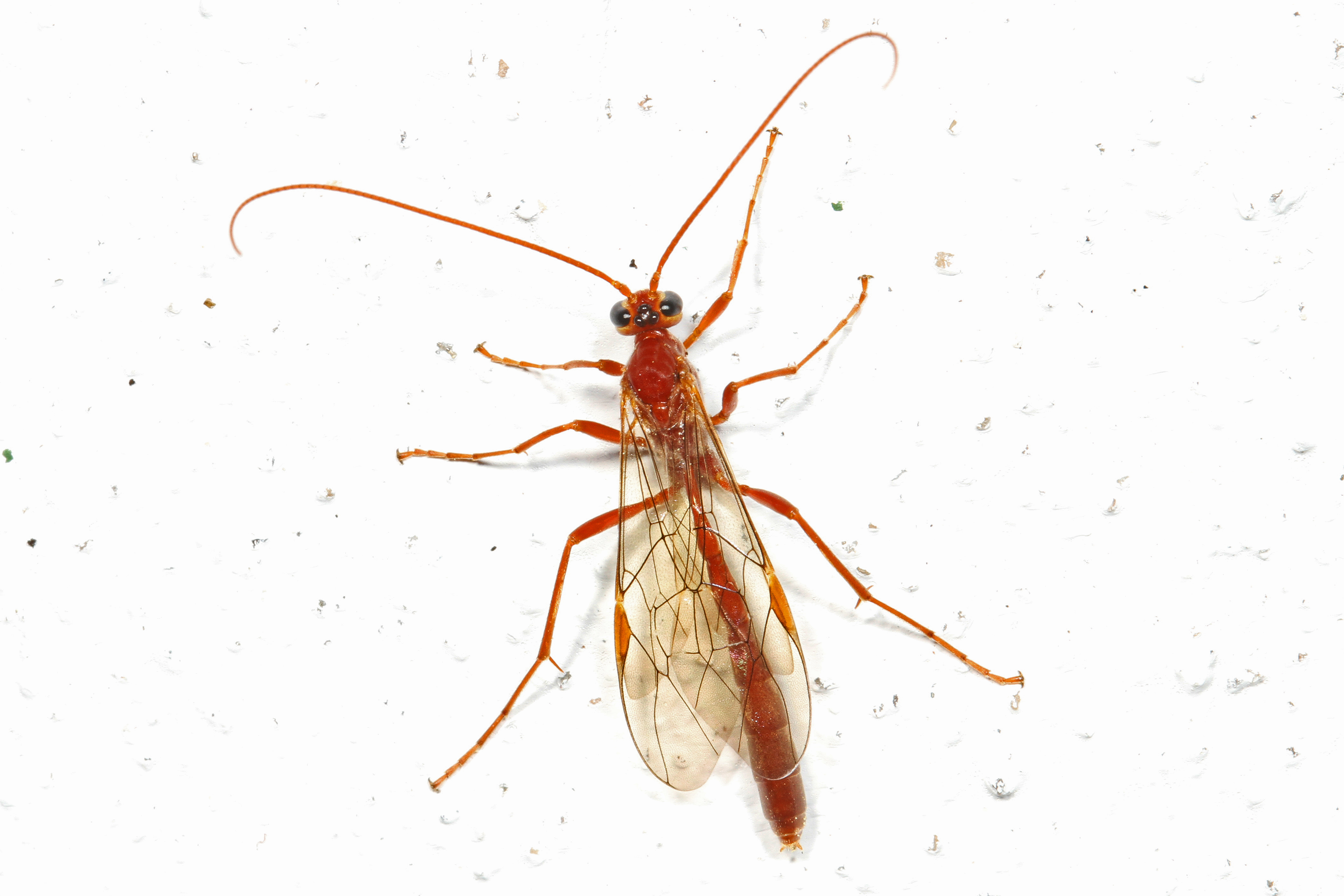
- Ophion sp. photographed in Virginia

Scientific classification
- Kingdom: Animalia
- Phylum: Arthropoda
- Class: Insecta
- Order: Hymenoptera
- Family: Ichneumonidae
- Tribe: Ophionini
- Genus: Ophion; Fabricius, 1798

= Ophion (insect) =

Genus of wasps

Ophion is a genus of ichneumonid wasps, which are nocturnal, parasitic, and often seen at lights. They are mostly orange to yellow in color, and are endoparasites of insect larvae, particularly Lepidoptera. They are very diverse but morphologically very similar. They have a worldwide distribution but the majority of species are found in the temperate zone.

The genus Ophion is distinguished by the absence of a transverse keel on the hind mesosternum. They also have a long membranous flange to the spur on the foretibia. They are within the same tribe as Afrophion, Alophophion, Xylophion, Sclerophion, and Rhopalophion.

== Species ==
There are 17 species of Ophion described from the Nearctic and 79 in the Palearctic.
