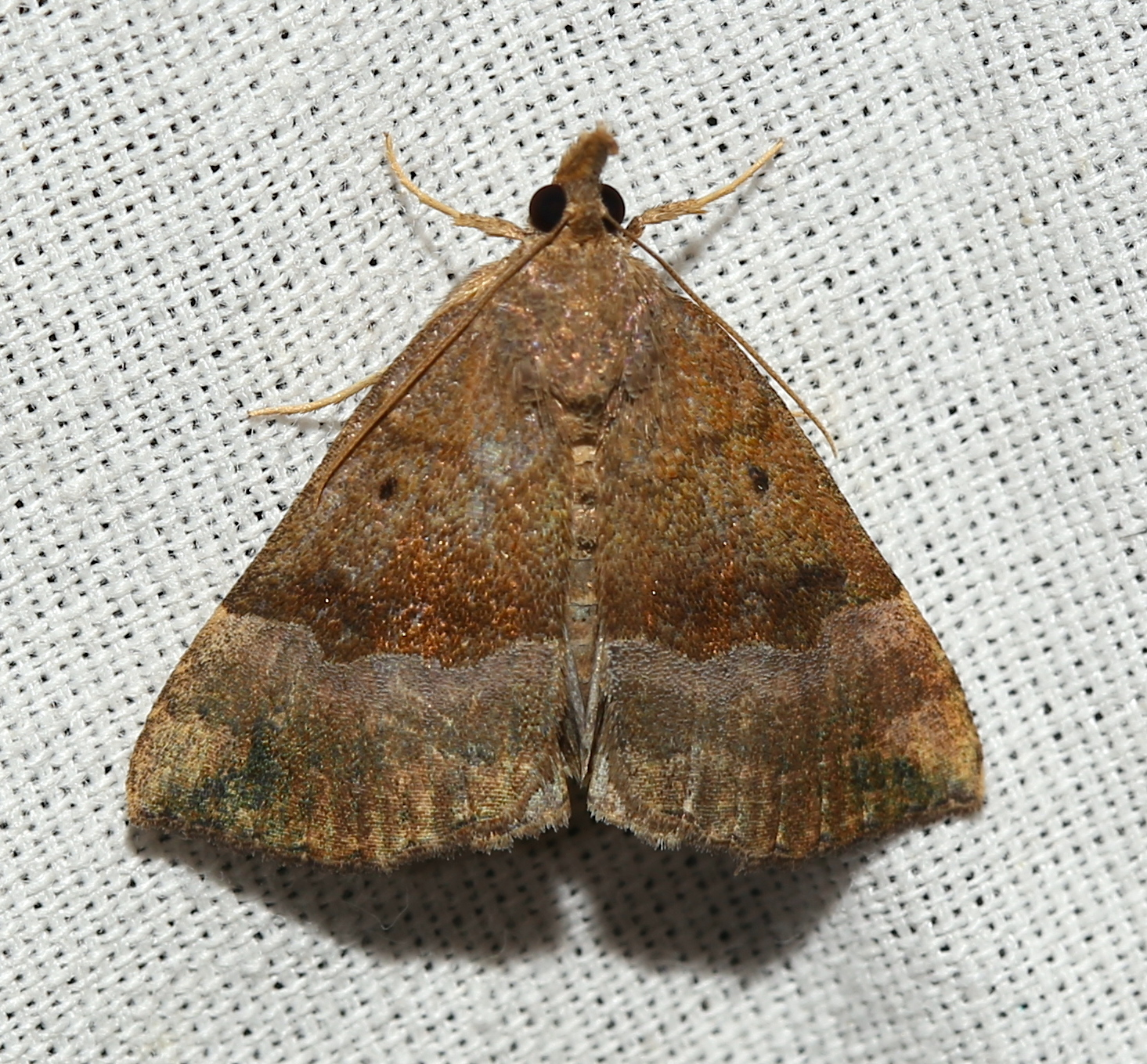

Scientific classification
- Kingdom: Animalia
- Phylum: Arthropoda
- Class: Insecta
- Order: Lepidoptera
- Superfamily: Noctuoidea
- Family: Erebidae
- Genus: Hypena
- Species: H. madefactalis

Binomial name
- Hypena madefactalis Guenée, 1854

Synonyms
- Hypena caducalis Walker, 1858; Hypena damnosalis Walker, 1859; Hypena achatinalis Zeller, 1872; Hypena profecta Grote, 1872; Bomolocha madefactalis (Guenée, 1854)

= Hypena madefactalis =

Species of moth

Hypena madefactalis, the gray-edged hypena or gray-eyed bomolocha, is a moth of the family Erebidae. The species was first described by Achille Guenée in 1854. It is found from extreme southern Canada (Quebec) to Georgia and Texas.

The wingspan is 25–32 mm. The moth flies from April to August in the south and from May to August in the north. There are at least two generations per year.

The larvae feed on walnut, mainly Juglans nigra and Juglans cinerea. Larvae have also been reared on shagbark hickory.
