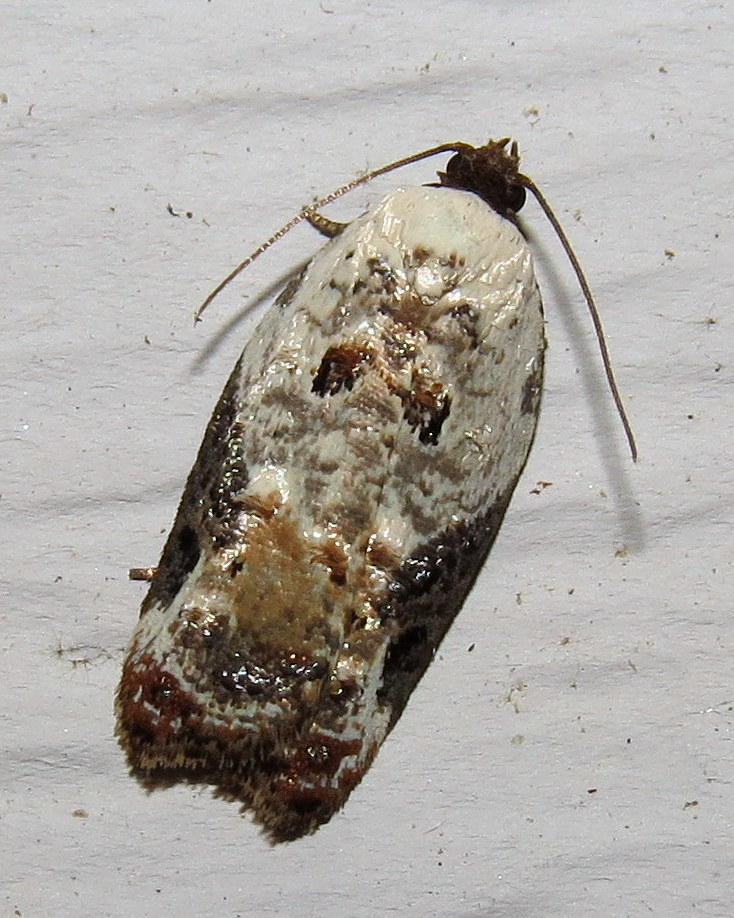

Scientific classification
- Domain: Eukaryota
- Kingdom: Animalia
- Phylum: Arthropoda
- Class: Insecta
- Order: Lepidoptera
- Family: Tortricidae
- Genus: Acleris
- Species: A. nivisellana

Binomial name
- Acleris nivisellana (Walsingham, 1879)

Synonyms
- Tortrix nivisellana Walsingham, 1879; Peronea nivisellana

= Acleris nivisellana =

Snowy-shouldered acleris moth

Species of moth

Acleris nivisellana, the snowy-shouldered acleris moth, is a species of moth of the family Tortricidae. It is found in North America, where it has been recorded from southern Canada and the northern United States, south in the east to Maryland and Virginia, and south in the west to California.

The wingspan is 15–17 mm. Adults have been recorded on wing from March to November, probably in two generations per year.

The larvae feed on Crataegus, Malus (including Malus pumila), Physocarpus malvaceus, Prunus pensylvanica, Sorbus (including Sorbus scopulina) species.
