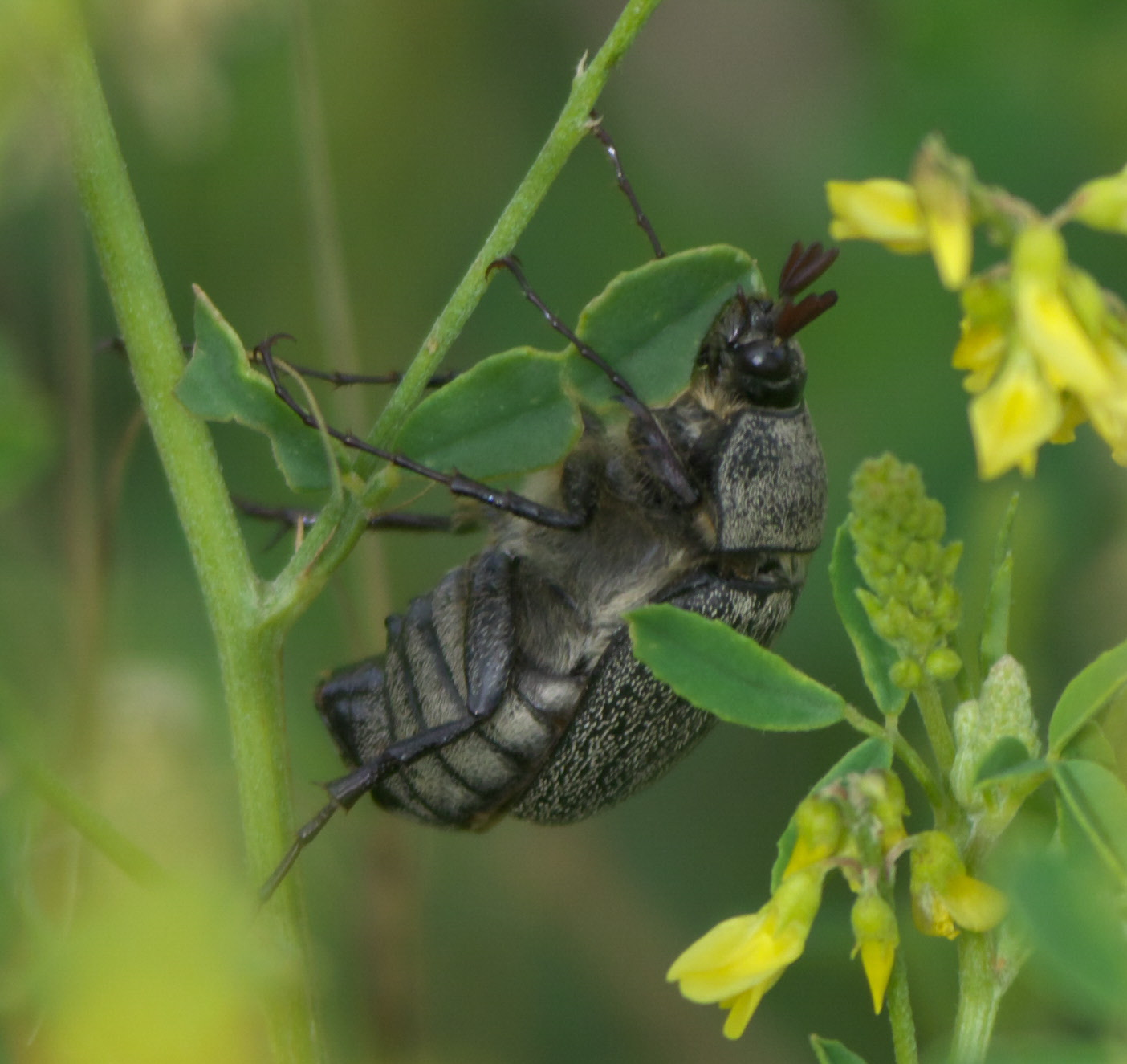

Scientific classification
- Kingdom: Animalia
- Phylum: Arthropoda
- Class: Insecta
- Order: Coleoptera
- Suborder: Polyphaga
- Infraorder: Scarabaeiformia
- Family: Scarabaeidae
- Genus: Phyllophaga
- Species: P. lanceolata

Binomial name
- Phyllophaga lanceolata (Say, 1824)

Synonyms
- Phyllophaga arizonae von Bloeker, 1936; Phyllophaga cazieri von Bloeker, 1936; Phyllophaga grisiana von Bloeker, 1936

= Phyllophaga lanceolata =

Species of beetle

Phyllophaga lanceolata is a species of scarab beetle in the family Scarabaeidae. It is found in North America.

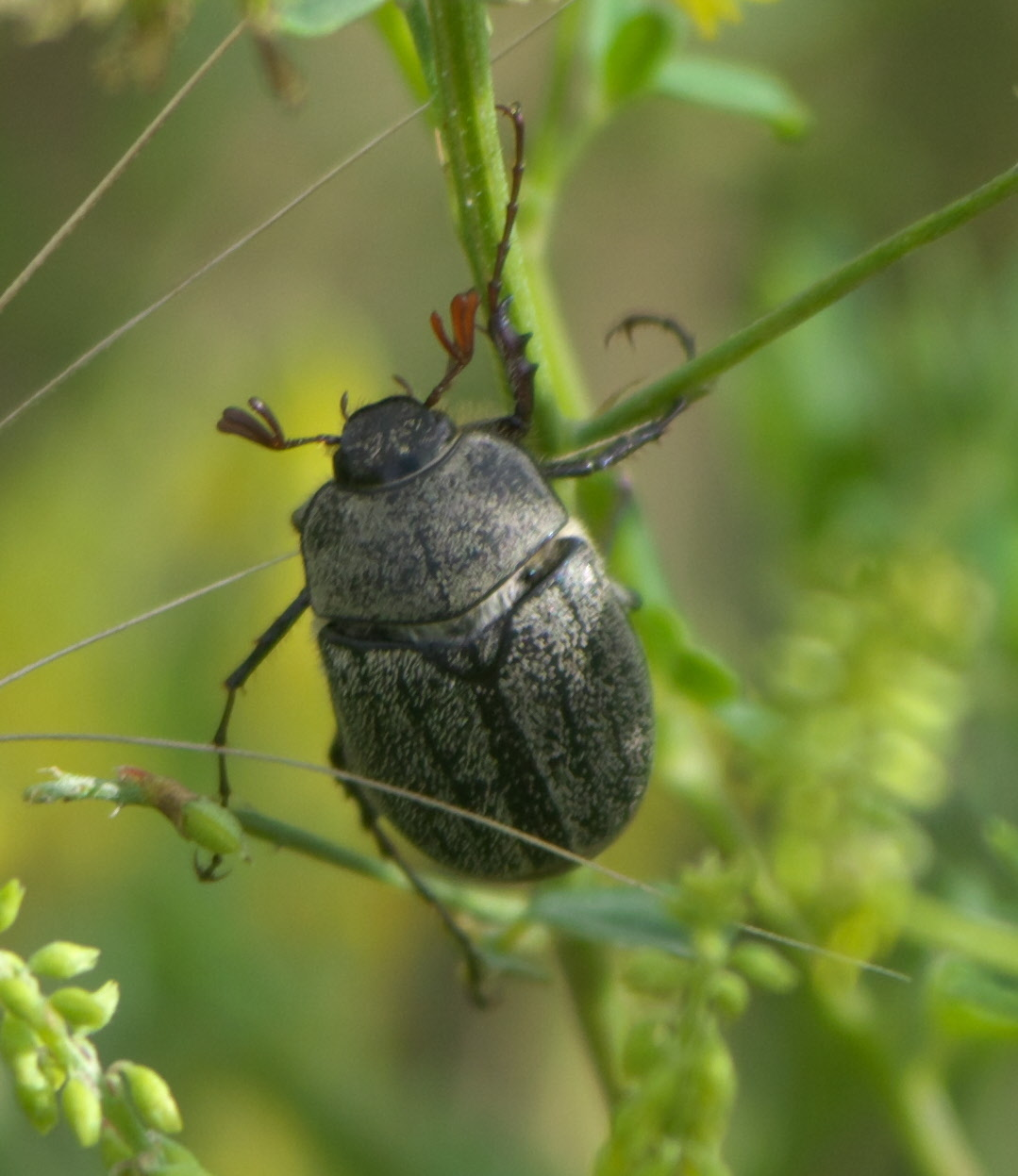
