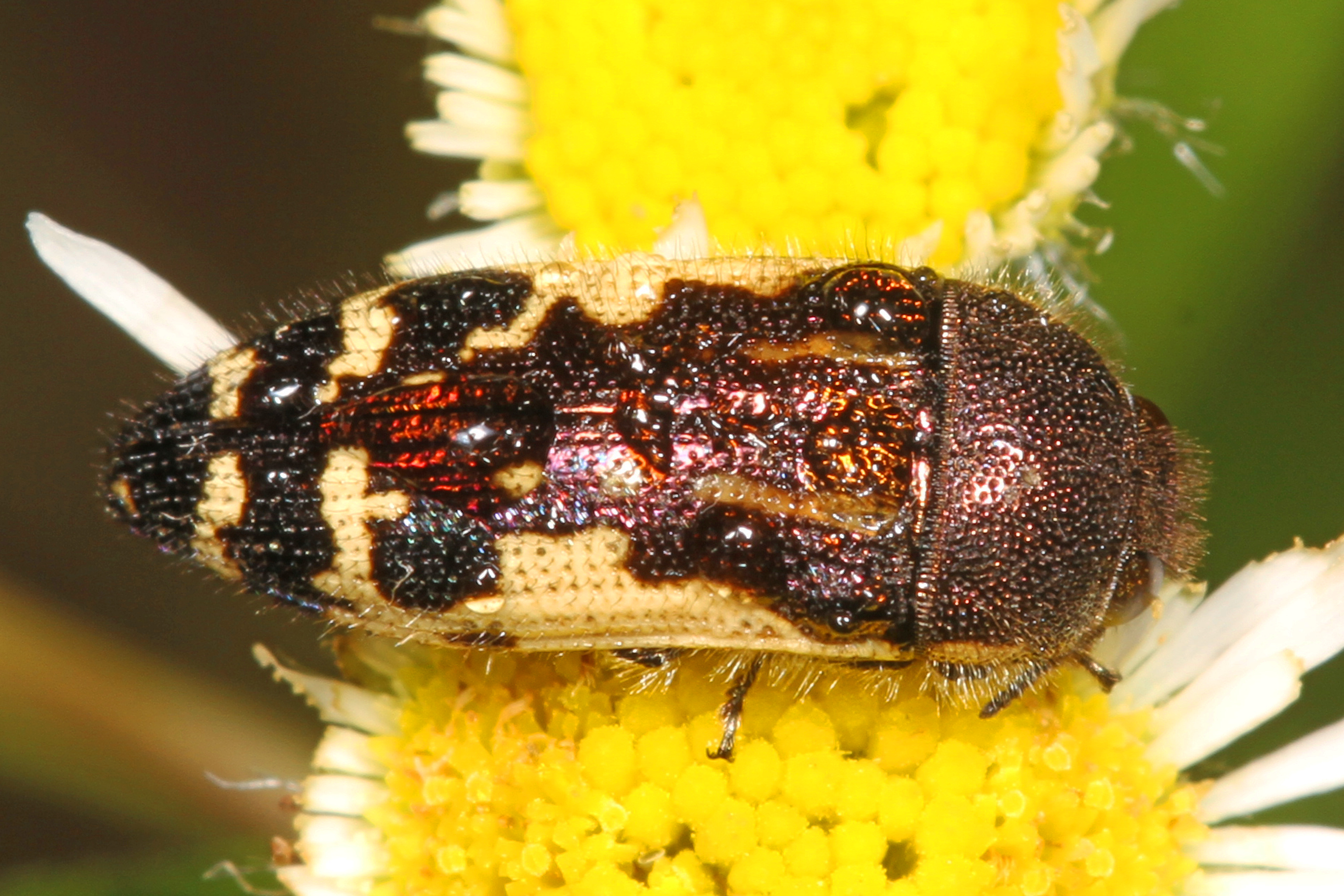

Scientific classification
- Kingdom: Animalia
- Phylum: Arthropoda
- Class: Insecta
- Order: Coleoptera
- Suborder: Polyphaga
- Infraorder: Elateriformia
- Family: Buprestidae
- Genus: Acmaeodera
- Species: A. pulchella

Binomial name
- Acmaeodera pulchella (Herbst, 1801)

Synonyms
- Acmaeodera flavosignata Gory, 1840

= Acmaeodera pulchella =

Species of beetle

Acmaeodera pulchella, the flat-headed bald cypress sapwood borer, is a species of metallic wood-boring beetle in the family Buprestidae. It is found in North America.
