= White flannel moth =

White flannel moth is a common name for several insects and may refer to:

- Megalopyge crispata, found in the United States
- Norape ovina, found in the Americas
