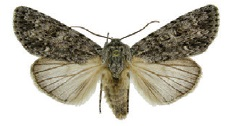

Scientific classification
- Kingdom: Animalia
- Phylum: Arthropoda
- Clade: Pancrustacea
- Class: Insecta
- Order: Lepidoptera
- Superfamily: Noctuoidea
- Family: Noctuidae
- Genus: Acronicta
- Species: A. impleta

Binomial name
- Acronicta impleta Walker, 1856

Synonyms
- Acronicta luteicoma; Acronicta krautwormi

= Acronicta impleta =

Species of moth

Acronicta impleta, the yellow-haired dagger moth, is a moth of the family Noctuidae. It is found in most of North America.

The wingspan is about 42 mm. Adults are on wing from April to July depending on the location.

The larvae feed on Ulmus, Acer, Betula, Salix and Quercus species.

== Subspecies ==
- Acronicta impleta impleta
- Acronicta impleta illita

== Gallery ==
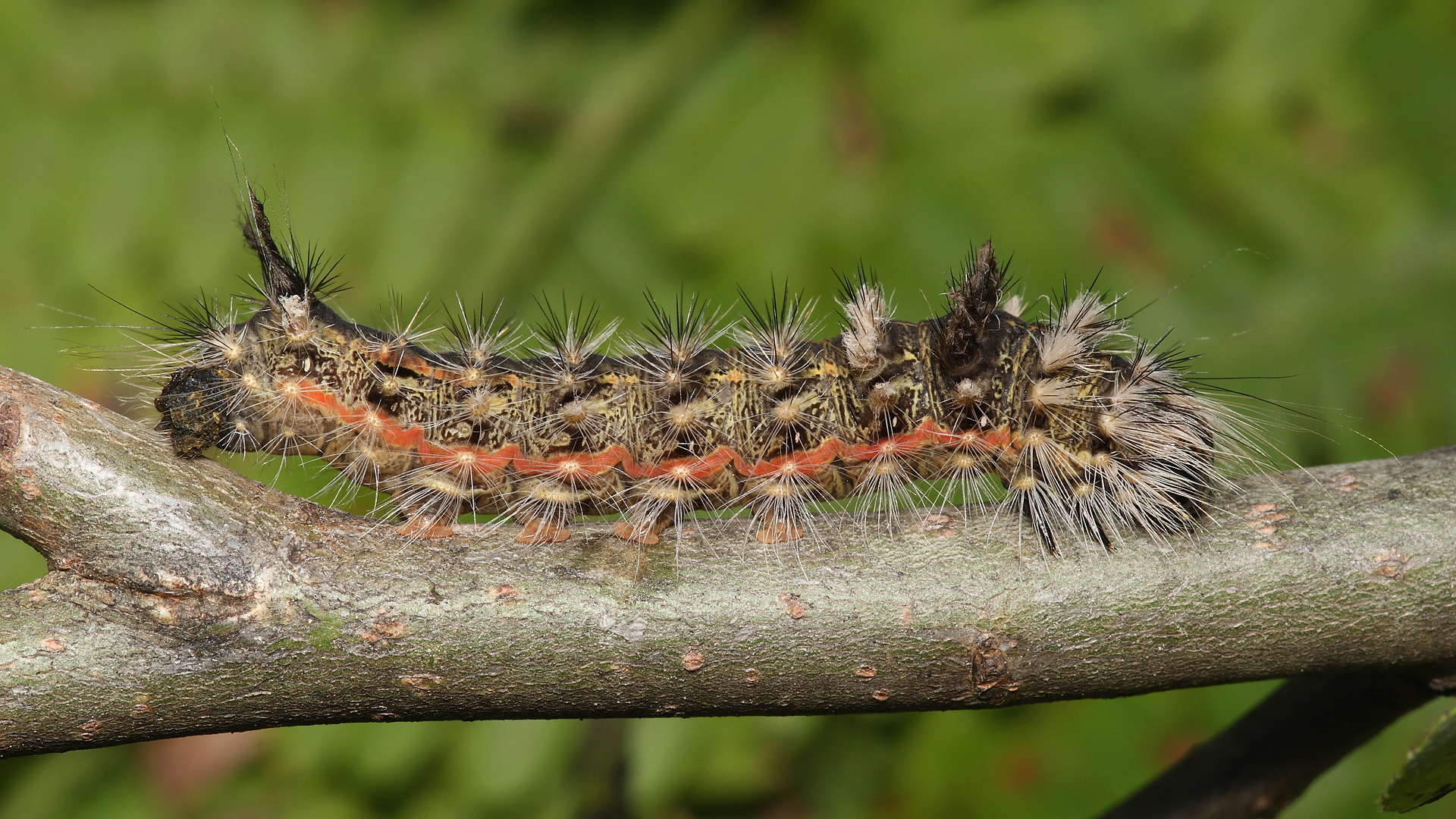
Larva

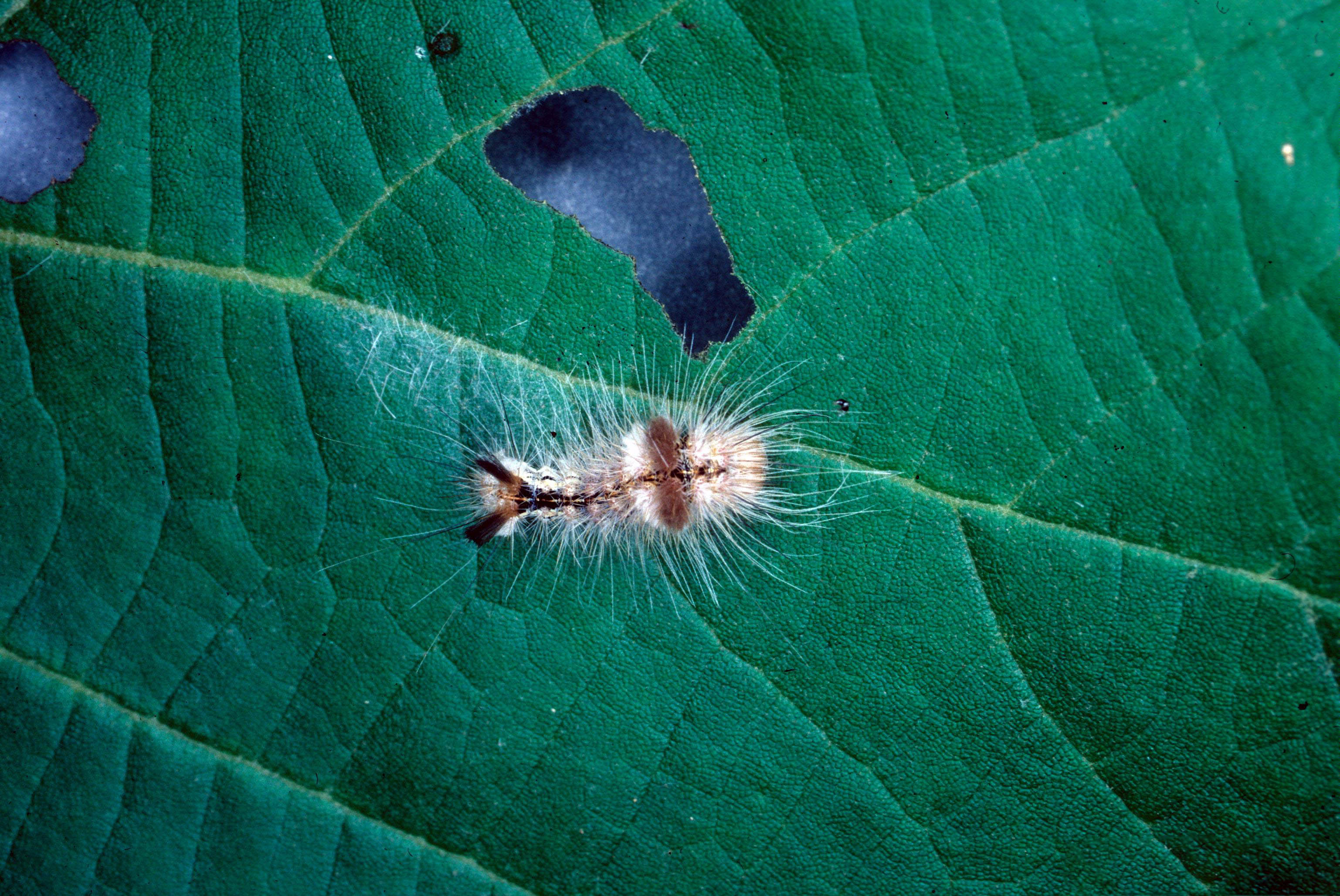

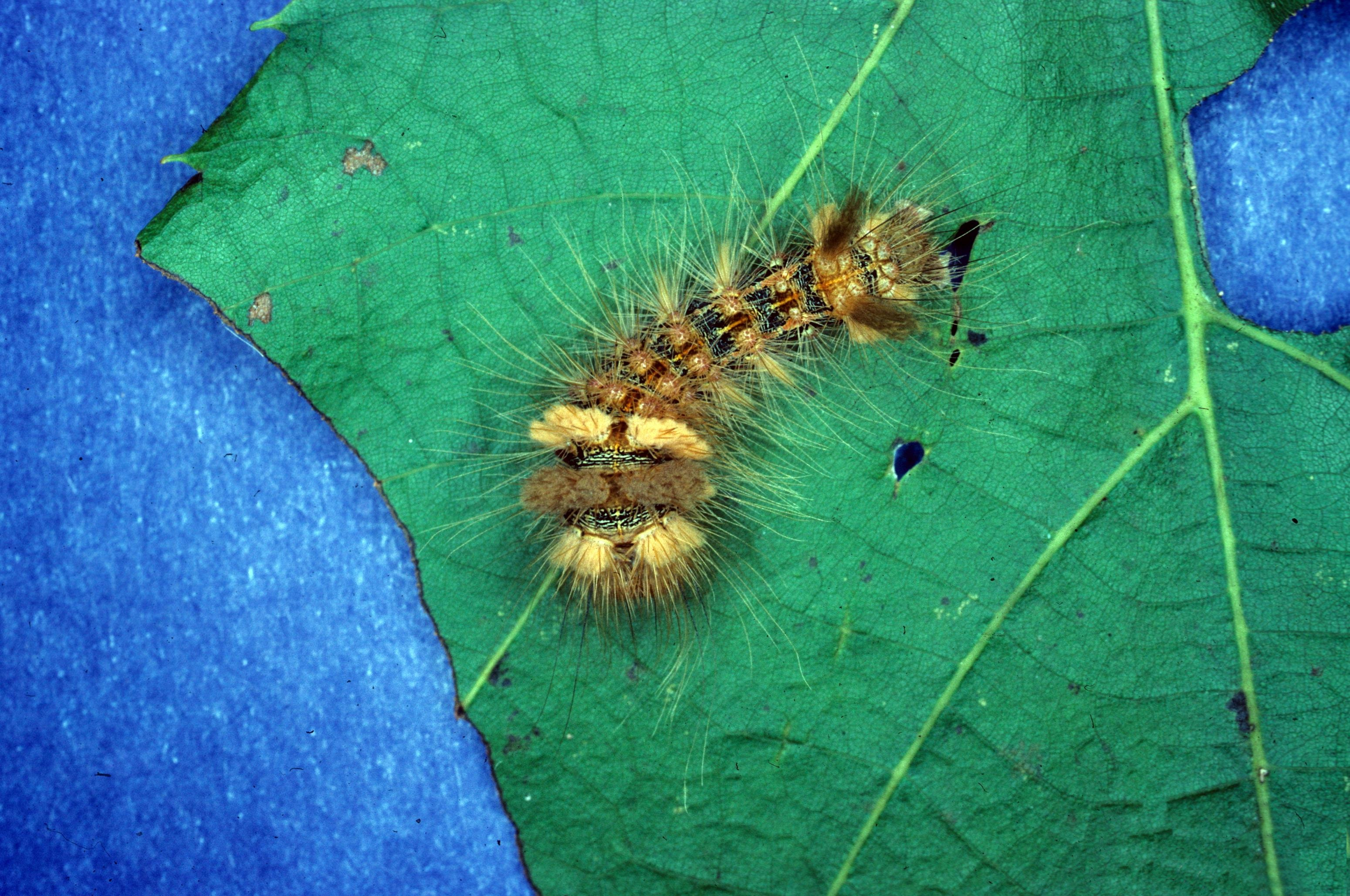
