= Beggar (disambiguation) =

A beggar is a person who begs on the street, usually for food or money.

Beggar or The Beggar may also refer to:

- The Beggar (album), a 2023 album by Swans
- The Beggar (novella), a 1965 novella album by Naguib Mahfouz
- The Beggar (film), a 1983 Egyptian comedy film
- The Beggar, a 1912 play by Reinhard Sorge
- The Beggar, a 1919 play by Bertolt Brecht
- Beggars (album), a 2009 album by Thrice
- Beggars Group, a British record company
- The Beggars, a 1568 painting by Pieter Bruegel the Elder
- The Beggars (film), a 1962 Brazilian drama film
- The Beggar, a character in The Muppet Christmas Carol
