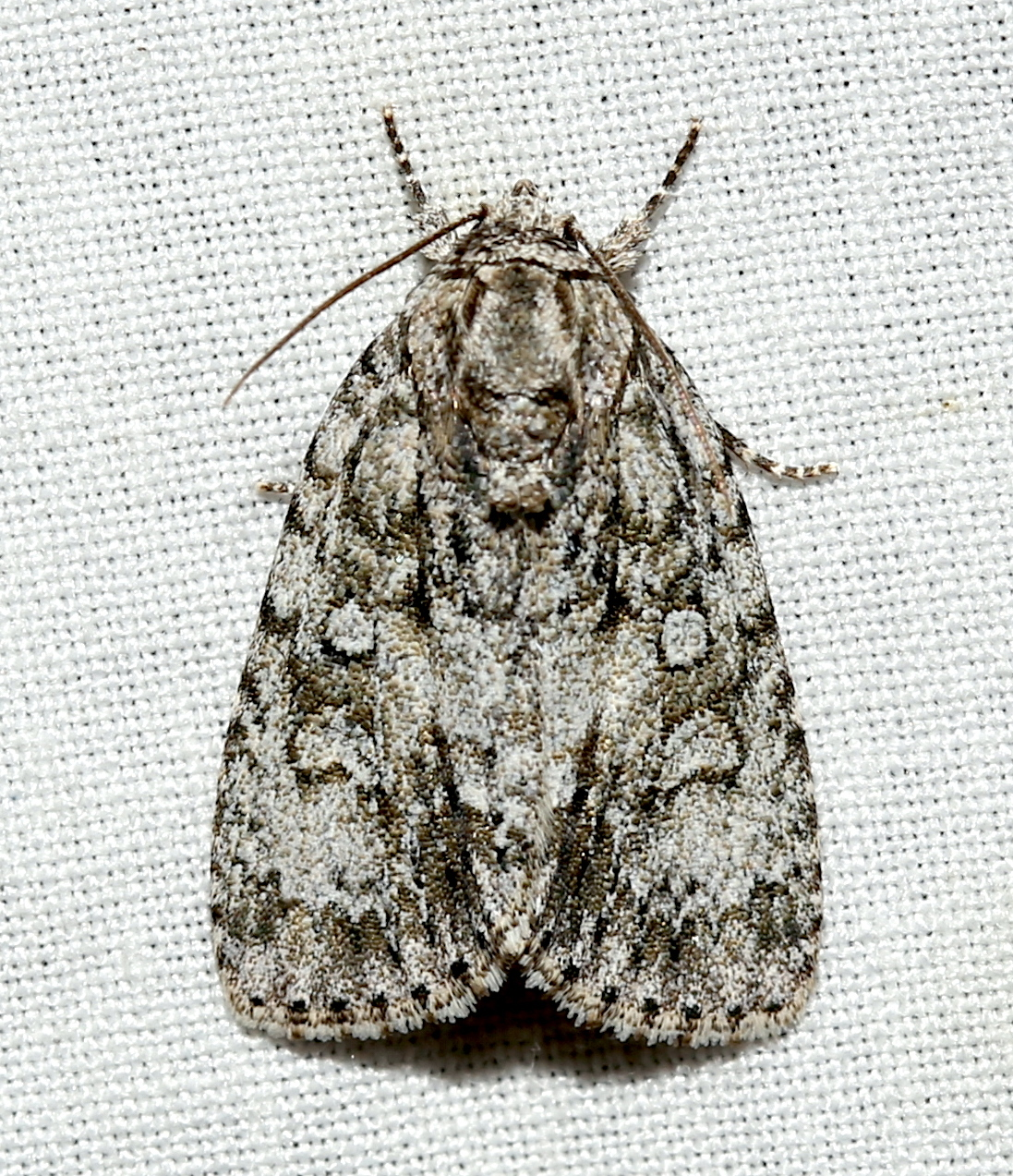

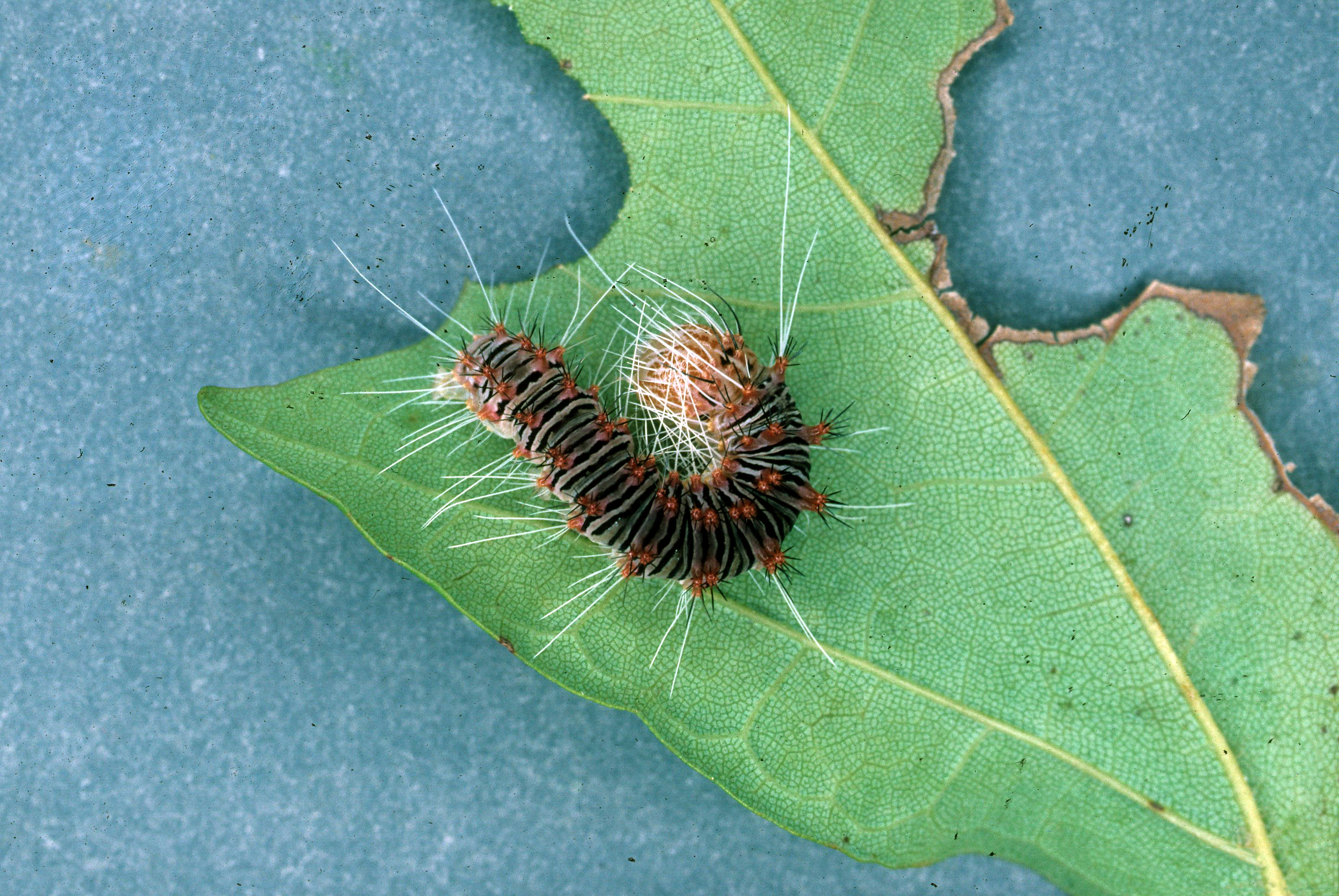
- Larva.

Scientific classification
- Kingdom: Animalia
- Phylum: Arthropoda
- Clade: Pancrustacea
- Class: Insecta
- Order: Lepidoptera
- Superfamily: Noctuoidea
- Family: Noctuidae
- Genus: Acronicta
- Species: A. retardata

Binomial name
- Acronicta retardata Walker, 1861

Synonyms
- Acronicta dissecta; Acronicta caesarea Smith, 1905

= Acronicta retardata =

Species of moth

Acronicta retardata, the retarded dagger moth, is a moth of the family Noctuidae. A. retardata is found from Nova Scotia to Florida, west to Texas, north to Manitoba. The larvae feed on the leaves of red maple and sugar maple.

== Description ==
The wingspan is 25–32 mm. Adults are on wing from April to August depending on the location. There are multiple generations per year.
