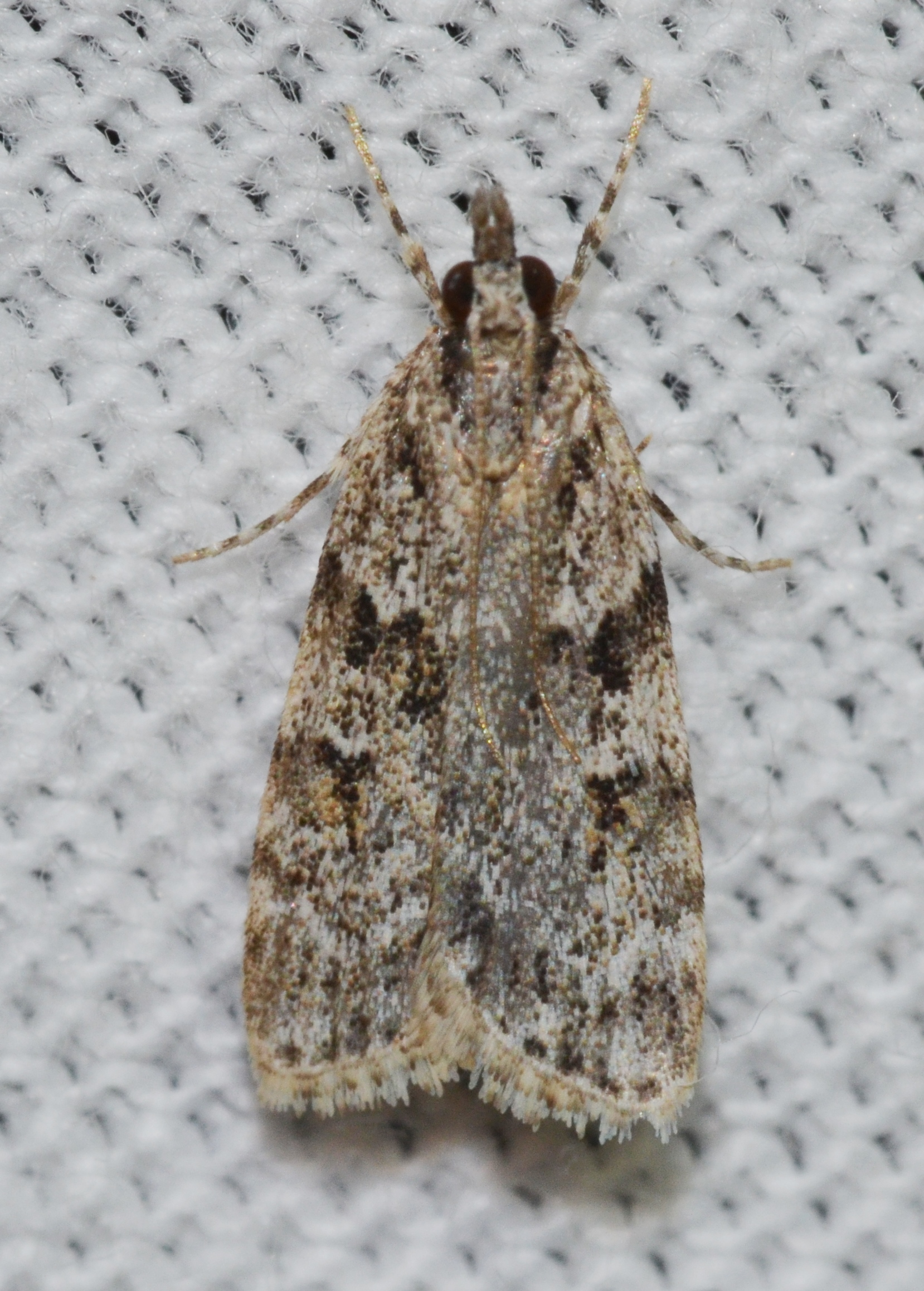

Scientific classification
- Kingdom: Animalia
- Phylum: Arthropoda
- Class: Insecta
- Order: Lepidoptera
- Family: Crambidae
- Genus: Scoparia
- Species: S. biplagialis

Binomial name
- Scoparia biplagialis Walker, 1866

Synonyms
- Scoparia alaskalis Barnes & Benjamin, 1922; Scoparia libella Grote, 1878

= Scoparia biplagialis =

Species of moth

Scoparia biplagialis, the double-striped scoparia moth, is a moth in the family Crambidae. It was described by Francis Walker in 1866. It is found in North America, where it has been recorded from Alabama, Alaska, Alberta, British Columbia, California, Colorado, Florida, Georgia, Illinois, Indiana, Kentucky, Maine, Manitoba, Maryland, Massachusetts, Michigan, Minnesota, Montana, New Brunswick, New Hampshire, New Jersey, New York, North Carolina, North Dakota, Nova Scotia, Ohio, Ontario, Oregon, Pennsylvania, Quebec, Tennessee, Virginia, Washington, West Virginia and Wisconsin.

The length of the forewings is 6–8 mm. Adults are on wing from June to August.

== Subspecies ==
- Scoparia biplagialis biplagialis
- Scoparia biplagialis afognakalis Munroe, 1972
- Scoparia biplagialis bellaeislae Munroe, 1972
- Scoparia biplagialis fernaldalis Dyar, 1904
- Scoparia biplagialis pacificalis Dyar, 1921
