= Harlequin bug =

Harlequin bug may refer to:

- Harlequin cabbage bug, Murgantia histrionica, a species of stinkbug found in North America
- Harmonia axyridis, a large lady beetle found worldwide
- Dindymus versicolor, a species of cotton stainer bug found in Australia

== See also ==
- Harlequin beetle
