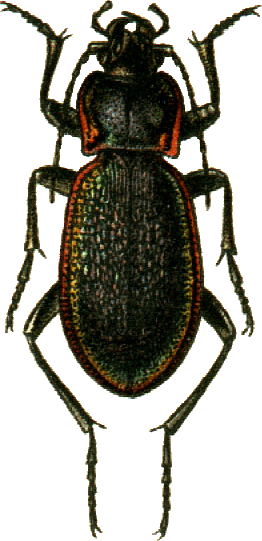

Scientific classification
- Domain: Eukaryota
- Kingdom: Animalia
- Phylum: Arthropoda
- Class: Insecta
- Order: Coleoptera
- Suborder: Adephaga
- Family: Carabidae
- Genus: Carabus
- Species: C. vietinghoffii

Binomial name
- Carabus vietinghoffii Adams, 1812

Synonyms
- Megodontus borealis Kwon & Lee, 1984; Carabus rugicolor Rapuzzi, 2010; Carabus huisaekicus Deuve & Li, 2009; Carabus lazoensis Obydov, 1999; Carabus levadensis Obydov, 1999; Carabus inhumeralis Breuning, 1964; Carabus moltrechti Semenov, 1908; Carabus vietinghoffianus Semenov, 1908; Carabus caesareus Semenov, 1906; Carabus impunctatus Kraatz, 1886; Carabus nobilis Ganglbauer, 1886; Carabus schaumi A.Morawitz, 1862; Carabus nazmovi Obydov, 1999; Carabus bureianus Shilenkov, 1996; Carabus obydovi E. & O.Berlov, 1996; Carabus tardokiyanensis E. & O.Berlov, 1996; Carabus leptoglyptus Obydov, 1995; Carabus deminutus Breuning, 1943; Carabus alaskanus Obydov, 1996; Carabus schtschegolewi Poppius, 1906; Carabus vietinghovi Fischer von Waldheim, 1820

= Carabus vietinghoffii =

Species of beetle

Carabus vietinghoffii, Vietinghoff's worm and slug hunter, is a species of ground beetle in the family Carabidae. It is found in Europe and Northern Asia (excluding China) and North America.

== Subspecies ==
- Carabus vietinghoffii bowringii Chaudoir, 1863 (China, North Korea, Russia)
- Carabus vietinghoffii dajianensis Deuve & Li, 2011 (China)
- Carabus vietinghoffii fulgidiformis Obydov, 2008 (China)
- Carabus vietinghoffii fulgidus Fischer von Waldheim, 1828 (China, Russia)
- Carabus vietinghoffii vietinghoffii (USA, Canada, Russia, Alaska)
