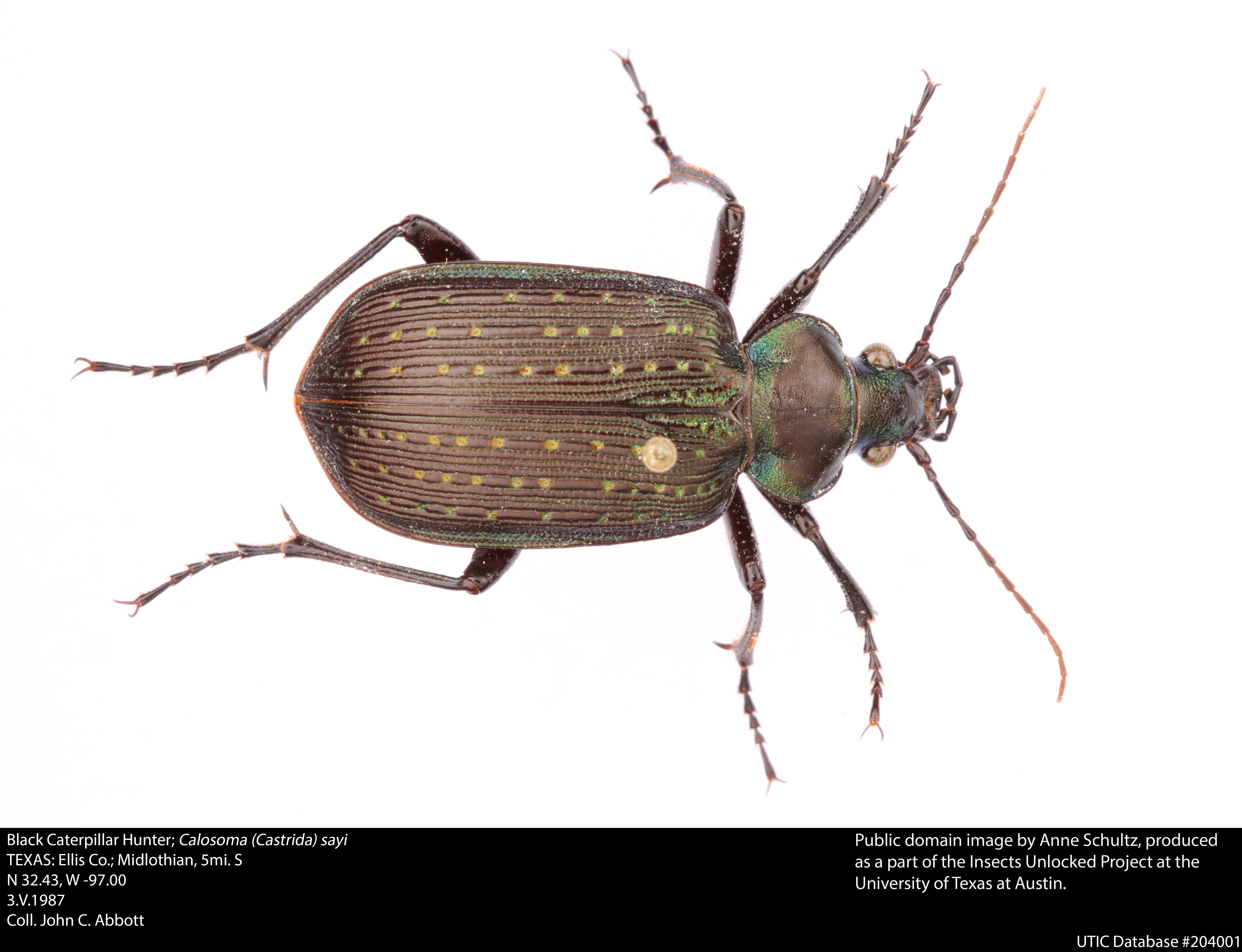

Scientific classification
- Kingdom: Animalia
- Phylum: Arthropoda
- Clade: Pancrustacea
- Class: Insecta
- Order: Coleoptera
- Suborder: Adephaga
- Family: Carabidae
- Genus: Calosoma
- Species: C. sayi

Binomial name
- Calosoma sayi Dejean, 1826

Synonyms
- Calosoma armatum Laporte, 1835; Calosoma abdominale Géhin, 1885; Calosoma virginicum Casey, 1897; Calosoma cuprascens Roeschke, 1900

= Calosoma sayi =

Species of beetle

Calosoma sayi

Calosoma sayi, also known as "Say's caterpillar hunter" or "Black Caterpillar Hunter", is a species of ground beetle of the subfamily Carabinae. It was described by Pierre François Marie Auguste Dejean in 1826. A large, lustrous black beetle found throughout the United States, its habitat is fields and disturbed areas. About 25mm to 28mm long, its grooved elytra have rows of metallic dots or pits. Said pits are smaller than many other Calosoma, and are ruby red. Both larvae and adults prey upon other larvae and pupae, specifically those of grubs, flies, and lepidoptera.

These insects can be found roaming in forests, grasslands, and other areas in search of food, which is primarily caterpillars and other invertebrates. They are fast runners, using their long legs to cover large expanses of area and to evade predation. They are typically nocturnal hunters and may hide under stones, leaves, or wood during the day.
