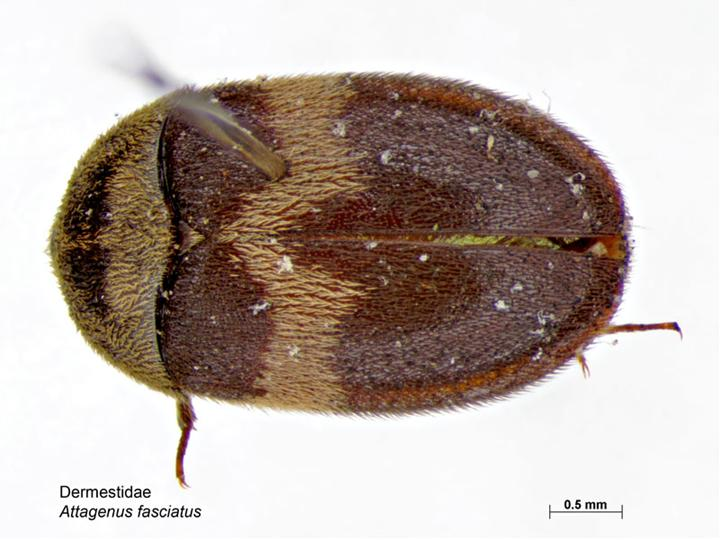

Scientific classification
- Kingdom: Animalia
- Phylum: Arthropoda
- Clade: Pancrustacea
- Class: Insecta
- Order: Coleoptera
- Suborder: Polyphaga
- Family: Dermestidae
- Tribe: Attagenini
- Genus: Attagenus
- Species: A. fasciatus

Binomial name
- Attagenus fasciatus (Thunberg, 1795)

= Attagenus fasciatus =

Species of beetle

Attagenus fasciatus, known generally as banded black carpet beetle, is a species of carpet beetle in the family Dermestidae. Other common names include the tobacco seed beetle and wardrobe beetle. It is found in North America, Oceania, and Europe. Attagenus fasciatus is nearly a cosmopolitan species and widespread throughout the tropical and subtropical regions of the world.
