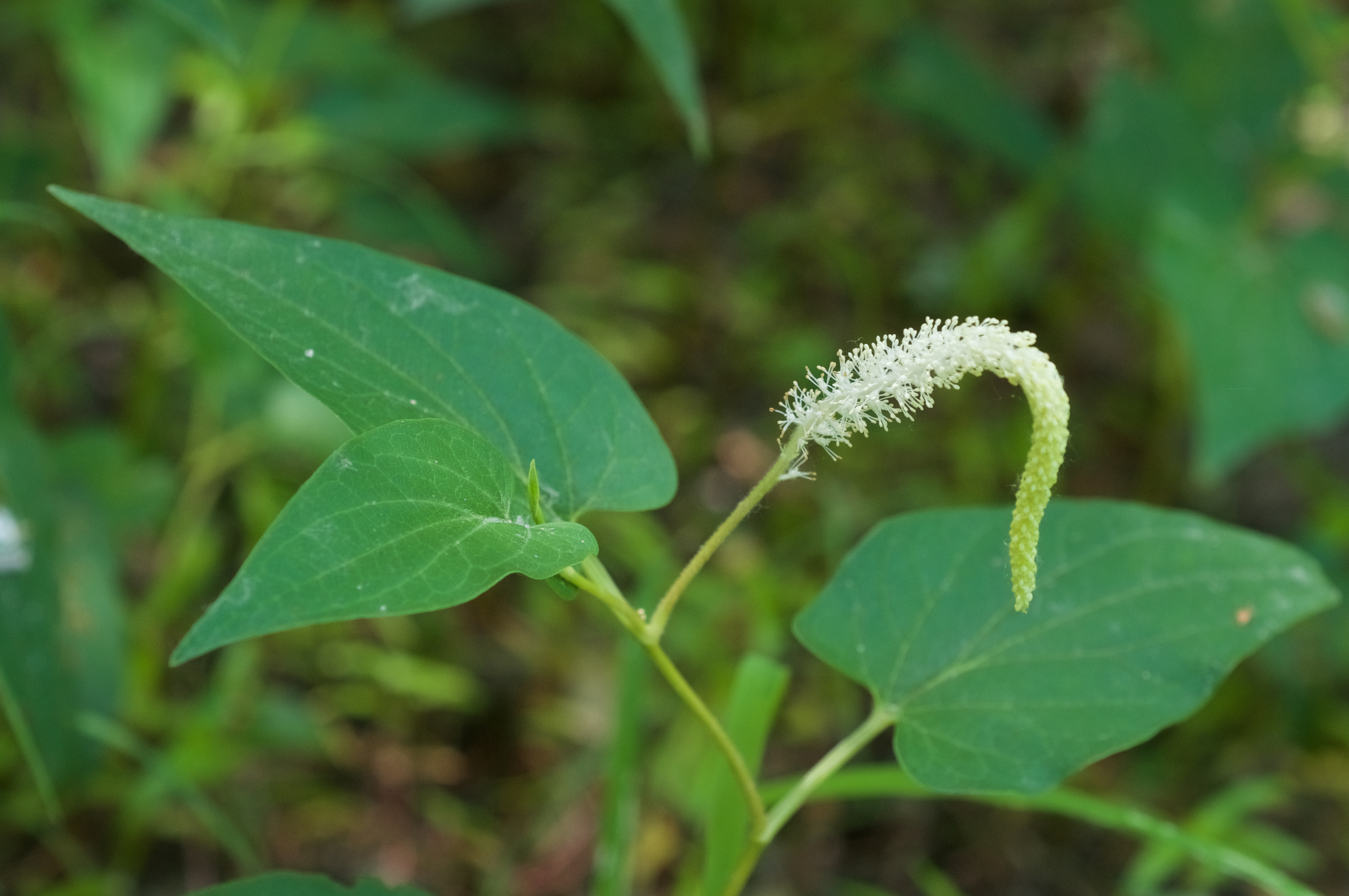
- S. cernuus, foliage and inflorescence

Scientific classification
- Kingdom: Plantae
- Clade: Embryophytes
- Clade: Tracheophytes
- Clade: Spermatophytes
- Clade: Angiosperms
- Clade: Magnoliids
- Order: Piperales
- Family: Saururaceae
- Genus: Saururus
- Species: S. cernuus

Binomial name
- Saururus cernuus L.

= Saururus cernuus =

Lizard's tail

Species of flowering plant

Saururus cernuus (lizard's tail, water-dragon, dragon's tail, swamp root) is a species of herbaceous perennial plant.

The plant grows up to about 1 metre (3 1/2 ft) tall. The leaves are somewhat heart-shaped and are arranged alternately on the stem. The inflorescence is 7 1/2–20 1/2 centimetres (3–8 in) long. After maturing, the white flowers turn brown, giving the plant its name, lizard's tail.

The plant can be found in the wetlands of eastern North America. It is an important food source for animals such as beavers, which notably reduce its abundance. Some Native Americans used the plant medicinally, using it to soothe inflammation, fevers, and body aches.

== Description ==
Saururus cernuus is a herbaceous wetland plant that commonly grows to 0.6 to 0.9 metres (2 to 3 ft) in height. Due to formation of dense rhizomes, lizard's tail can be very competitive for below-ground resources. The leaves are heart-shaped (cordate), arrow-shaped, or lance-shaped, and alternate along the stem of the plant. When the leaves are crushed they release a citrus or sassafras aroma.

The plant can be distinctively identified during the flowering season. Flowering occurs during the summer months, May to early August, blossoming with small white flowers composing a spike inflorescence 7 1/2–20 1/2 centimetres (3–8 in) long. The flowers are simple, and have 6 or fewer stamens and 3 or fewer carpels. After maturing, the flowers turn brown, giving the plant its namesake, lizard's tail.

== Taxonomy ==
Synonyms include Saururus cernuus f. submersus Glück.

=== Etymology ===
The genus name Saururus is from the Greek word, sauros meaning "lizard" and oura meaning "tail", stemming from flowers that turn brown. The species name "cernuus" is Latin and refers to the plant's drooping and distinctive inflorescence.

== Distribution and habitat ==
Saururus cernuus L. is distributed in Ontario, Canada, and throughout the Southeastern United States, normally within marshes, along the edges of streams or lakes.

The range includes the mid-Atlantic states to Florida. Lizards tails are found in freshwater wetlands, normally submerged in shallow water. Saururus cernuus can thrive in saturated soil and can also tolerate shading by larger trees.

Rhizomes are abundantly present within this species, reaching lengths up to 3 m (10 ft). Their rhizomes spread laterally below the soil. These rhizomes are characterized with a linear series of nodes that follow along the tip of the rhizomes. Seeds are dispersed in autumn, and are light green, then turn brown.

== Ecology ==
Studies show a possible connection with longhorn beetles and S. cernuus. Mating of three different species of longhorn beetles have been observed in association with S. cernuus: Strangalia luteicornis, Typocerus lugubris, and Typocerus velutinus velutinus. Moreover, 29 other species of beetles have been observed on S. cernuus. Flowers and fruits of S. cernuus are a likely food source for many beetles.

Herbivores such as the North American beaver (Castor canadensis) have had a strong impact on aquatic plants. Beavers often chose this lizard's tail plant rather than other plants that may thrive within the area. Studies show that in areas where beavers are present, lizard's tail are less likely to be observed. In an exclusion study, beavers reduced the plant's prevalence by 45%.

It can be toxic to livestock if overeaten.

== Conservation ==
Lizards tail are abundantly present throughout the United States. In fact, this plant can potentially outcompete other species of plants Saururus cernuus form lengthy rhizomes that can out compete within their herbaceous layer.

== Uses ==
Saururus cernuus have been used to restore and create wetlands. Native plant nurseries sell rhizomes for wetland restoration.

Native Americans and early settlers used lizard's tail for traditional medicinal properties. The rhizomes were ground and used as a sedative, to treat swelling and inflammation, and to lower fevers.

The Cherokee and Chocktaw peoples mashed up the roots as a poultice and applied the plant to soothe inflammation of the breasts and back. The Seminoles used the plant as an antirheumatic, as well as a way to soothe fevers and body aches.
