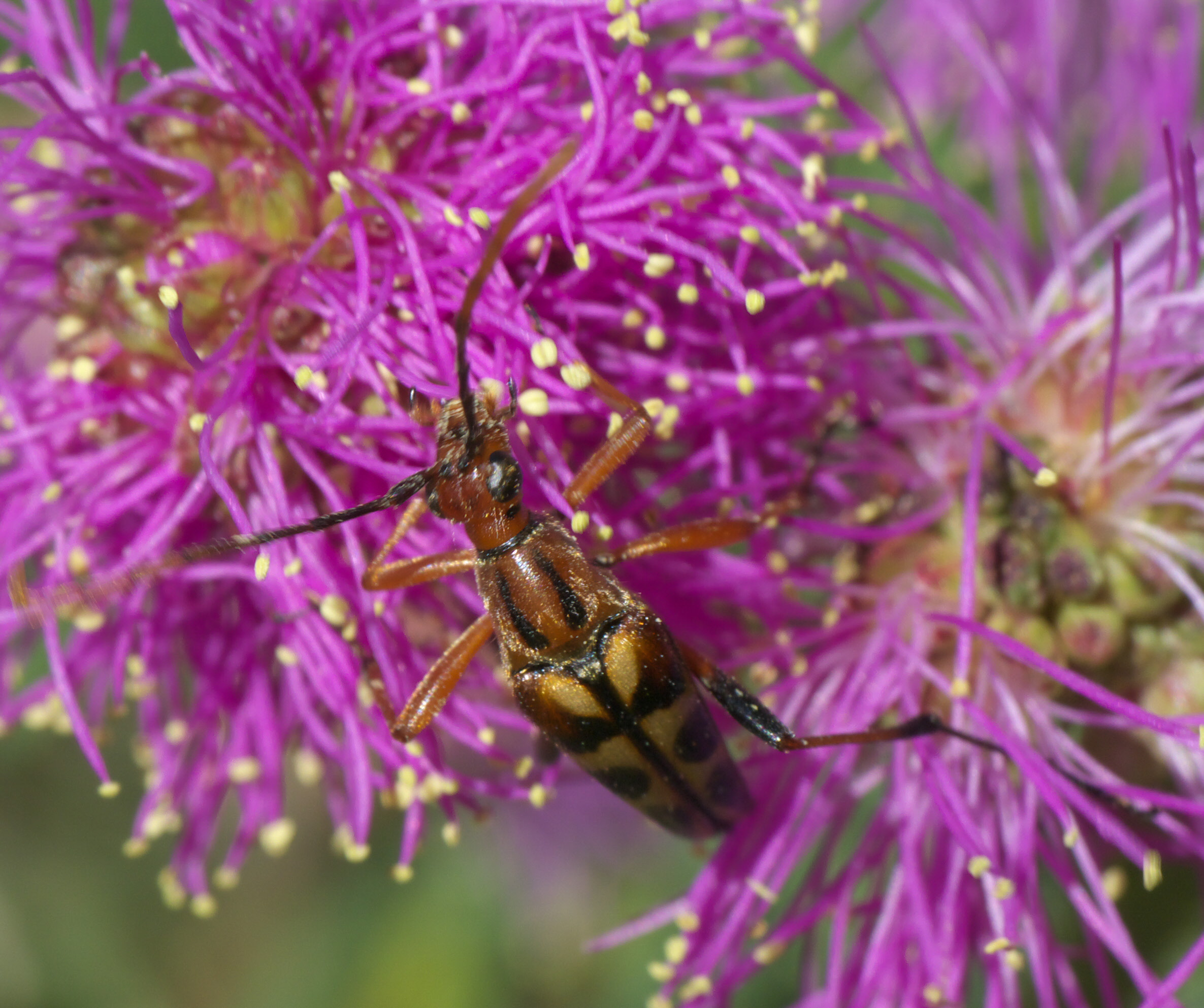

Scientific classification
- Domain: Eukaryota
- Kingdom: Animalia
- Phylum: Arthropoda
- Class: Insecta
- Order: Coleoptera
- Suborder: Polyphaga
- Infraorder: Cucujiformia
- Family: Cerambycidae
- Genus: Strangalia
- Species: S. luteicornis

Binomial name
- Strangalia luteicornis (Fabricius, 1775)

Synonyms
- Strangalia carolinae (Casey, 1913); Strangalia eversa (Casey, 1913)

= Strangalia luteicornis =

Species of beetle

Strangalia luteicornis is a species of flower longhorn in the family of beetles known as Cerambycidae. It is found in North America. It has been observed mating on Hydrangea arborescens and Saururus cernuus, with the female consuming pollen from the latter plant.

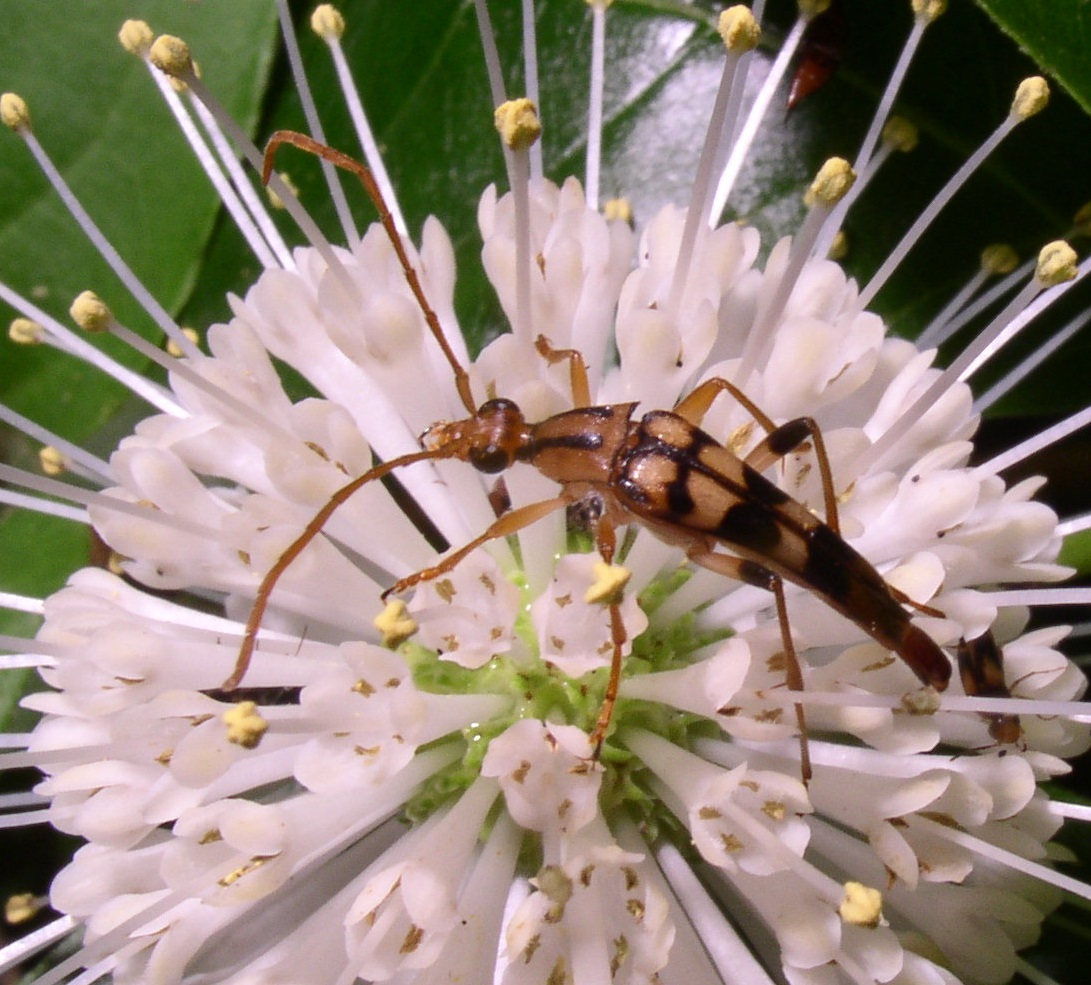
On buttonbush

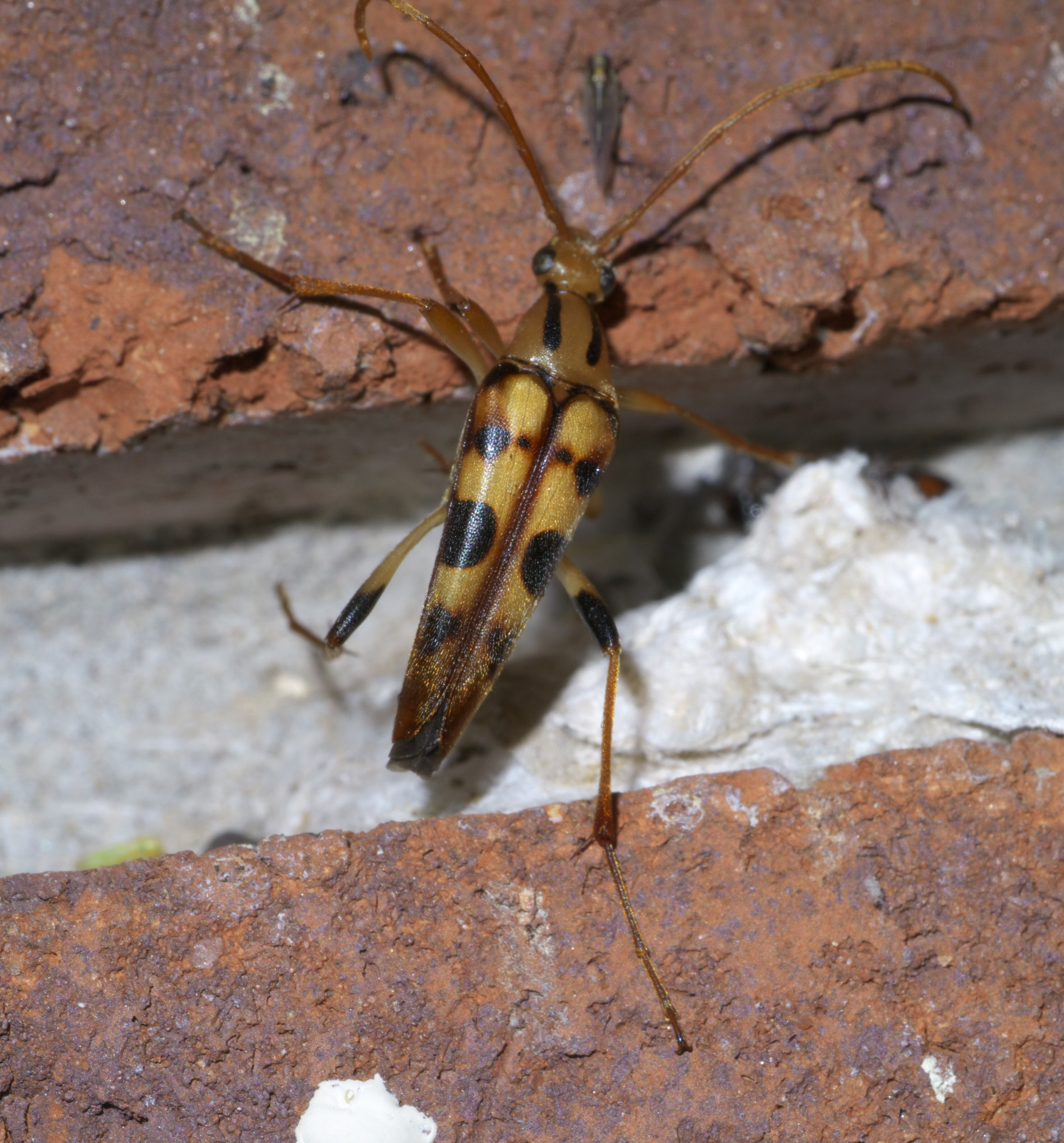
