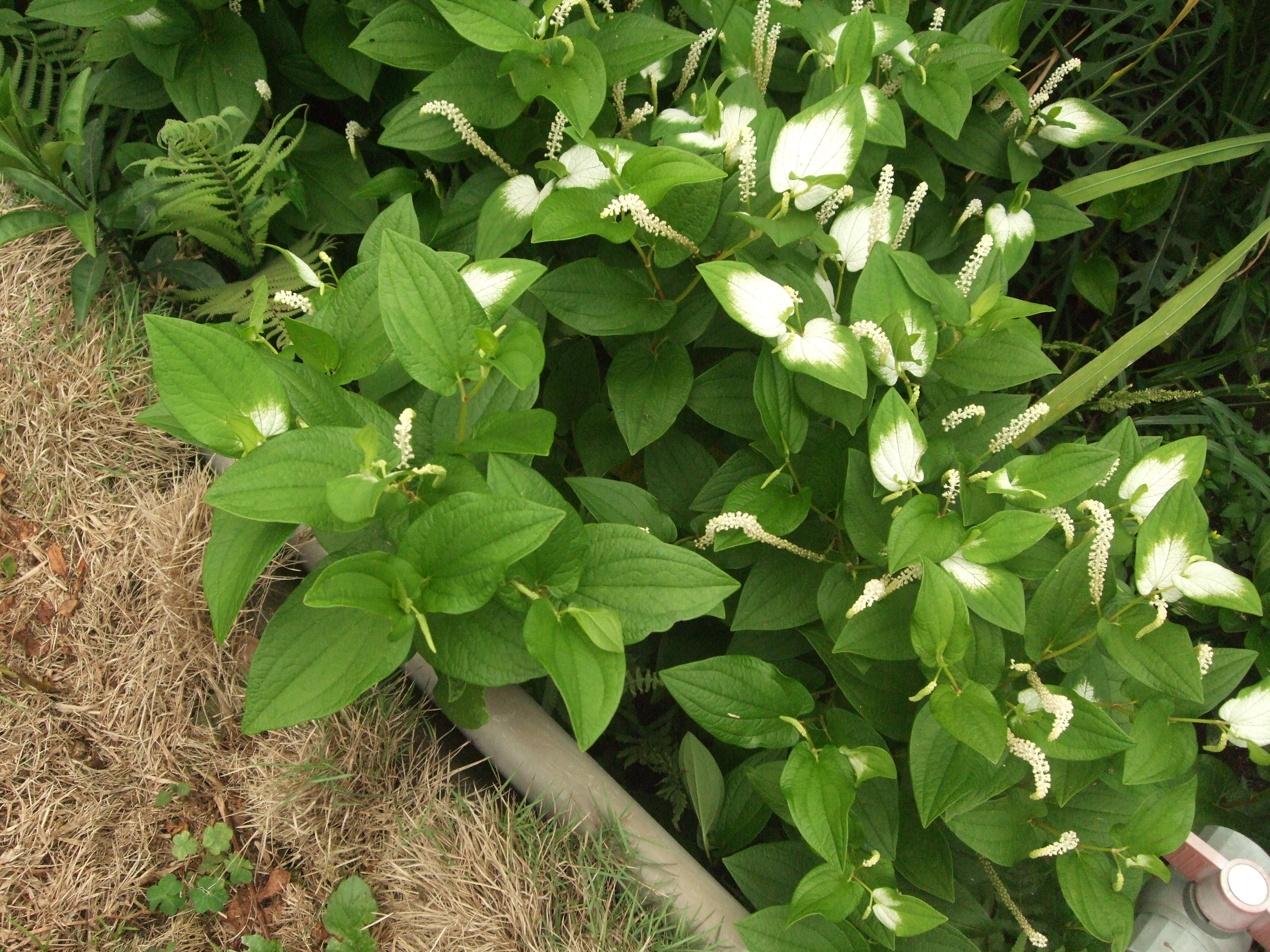

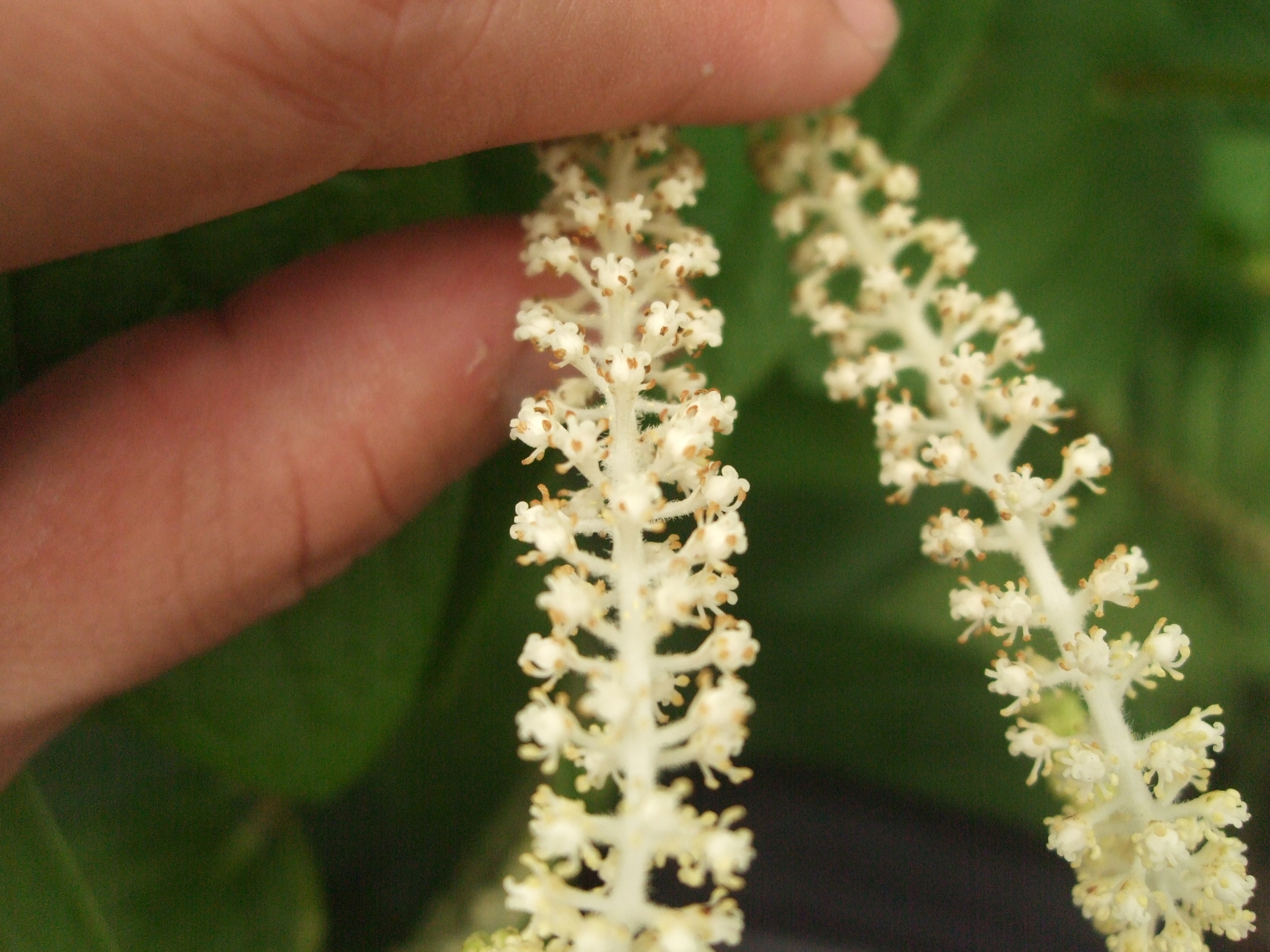
- S. chinensis, foliage and inflorescences

Scientific classification
- Kingdom: Plantae
- Clade: Tracheophytes
- Clade: Angiosperms
- Clade: Magnoliids
- Order: Piperales
- Family: Saururaceae
- Genus: Saururus
- Species: S. chinensis

Binomial name
- Saururus chinensis (Lour.) Baill.

Synonyms
- Homotypic Synonyms: Saururopsis chinensis (Lour.) Turcz.; Saururus loureiroi Decne.; Spathium chinense Lour.; Heterotypic Synonyms: Saururus cernuus Thunb.; Saururus cumingii C.DC.

= Saururus chinensis =

Asian lizard's tail

Species of flowering plant

Saururus chinensis is a species of flowering plant in the family Saururaceae. It is sometimes referred to by the common name Asian lizard's tail,

== Description ==
It is an herb that grows in low, damp places to more than 1 meter high. Its leaves are green, papery, ribbed, densely glandular, and ovate to ovate-lanceolate, and (4-)10-20 × (2-)5-10 cm in size. Each flower spike resembles a lizard's tail.

== Distribution ==
It is native to North-Central, South-Central and Southeast China, Hainan, Japan, Korea, the Philippines, Qinghai, the Ryukyu Islands, Taiwan, and Vietnam.

== Traditional medical uses ==
Saururus chinensis been used to treat inflammation in diverse conditions such as edema, gonorrhea, and asthma.

== References Unsorted ==
- Baillon, H.E. 1871. Adansonia 10: 71.
- Missouri Botanical Garden
- Plants for a Future
