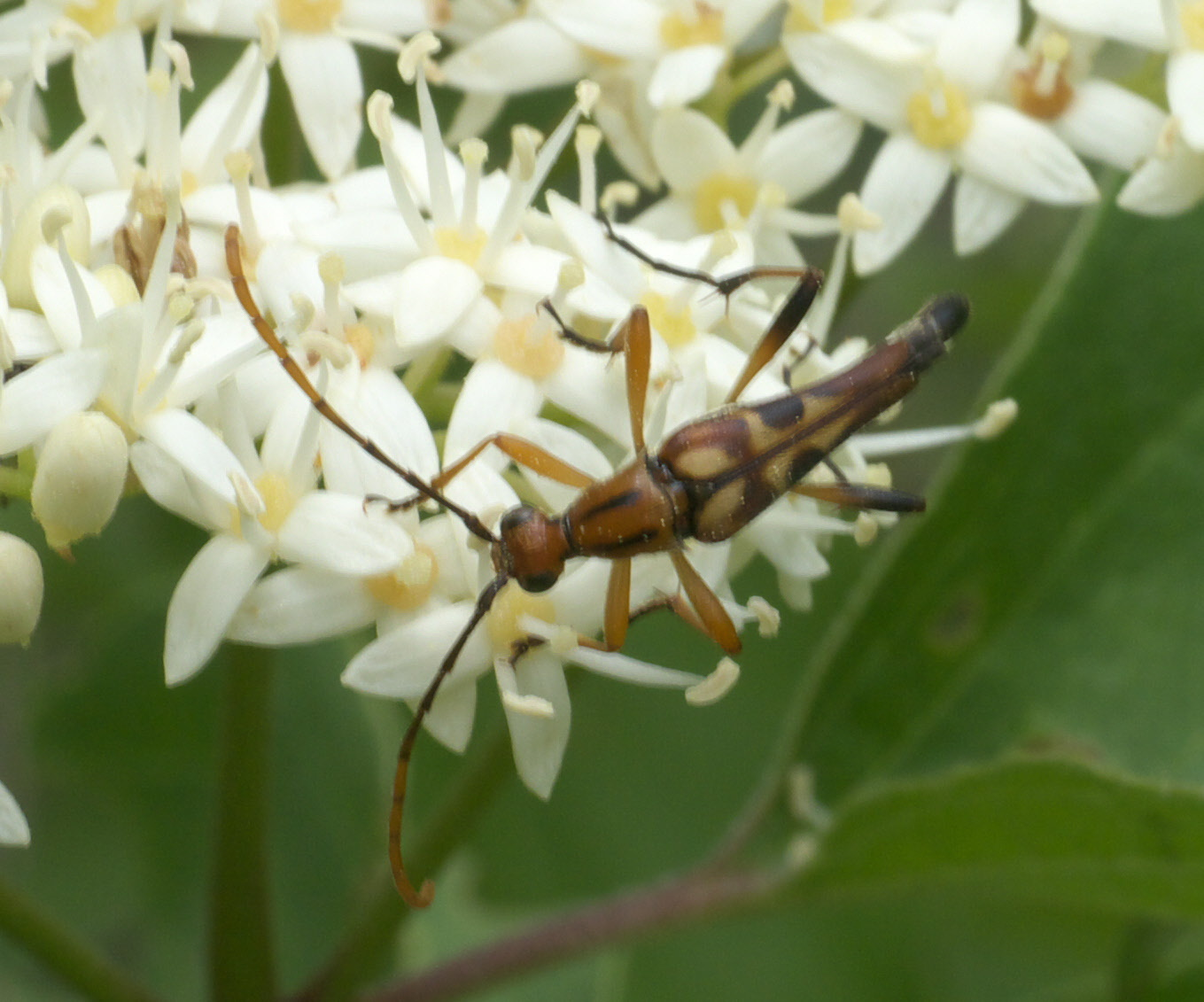
- Strangalia virilis, Oklahoma

Scientific classification
- Kingdom: Animalia
- Phylum: Arthropoda
- Class: Insecta
- Order: Coleoptera
- Suborder: Polyphaga
- Infraorder: Cucujiformia
- Family: Cerambycidae
- Genus: Strangalia
- Species: S. virilis

Binomial name
- Strangalia virilis LeConte, 1873

= Strangalia virilis =

Species of beetle

Strangalia virilis is a species of flower longhorn in the beetle family Cerambycidae. It is found in North America.
