= Typocerus confluens =

Scientific classification
- Kingdom: Animalia
- Phylum: Arthropoda
- Class: Insecta
- Order: Coleoptera
- Suborder: Polyphaga
- Infraorder: Cucujiformia
- Family: Cerambycidae
- Genus: Typocerus
- Species: T. confluens

Binomial name
- Typocerus confluens Casey, 1913

Synonyms
- Typocerus caligans Casey, 1913

Species of beetle

Typocerus confluens, the longhorn beetle, is a species of flower longhorn in the family Cerambycidae. It is found in North America.
