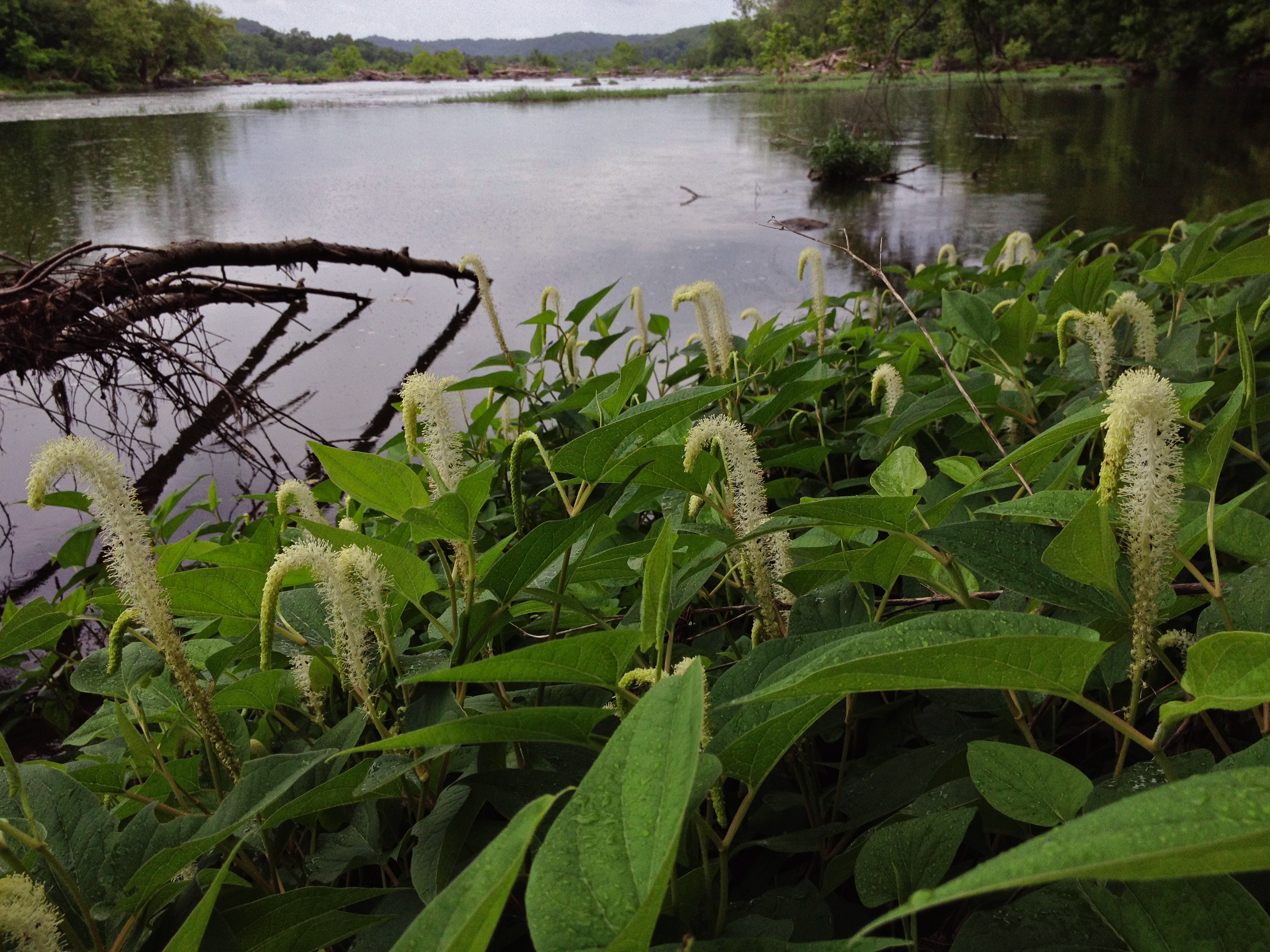
- S. cernuus in Virginia, US

Scientific classification
- Kingdom: Plantae
- Clade: Embryophytes
- Clade: Tracheophytes
- Clade: Spermatophytes
- Clade: Angiosperms
- Clade: Magnoliids
- Order: Piperales
- Family: Saururaceae
- Genus: Saururus; L.

Type species
- Saururus cernuus L.

Species
- Saururus cernuus; Saururus chinensis

= Saururus =

Saururus Temporal range: Campanian–Present

Genus of flowering plants

Saururus is a genus of plants in the family Saururaceae containing two species. Saururus cernuus is native to North America, and Saururus chinensis is native to Asia.

== Fossil record ==
Fossil seeds of †Saururus bilobatus have been described from middle Miocene strata of the Fasterholt area near Silkeborg in central Jutland, Denmark. Flowers, leaves, and pollen from †Saururus tuckerae are known from the older Ypresian age Eocene Okanagan Highlands Princeton Chert site.
