= Strangalia bicolor =

Scientific classification
- Kingdom: Animalia
- Phylum: Arthropoda
- Clade: Pancrustacea
- Class: Insecta
- Order: Coleoptera
- Suborder: Polyphaga
- Infraorder: Cucujiformia
- Family: Cerambycidae
- Genus: Strangalia
- Species: S. bicolor

Binomial name
- Strangalia bicolor (Swederus, 1787)

Synonyms
- Strangalia simulans (Casey, 1913)

Species of beetle

Strangalia bicolor, the bicolored flower longhorn, is a species of flower longhorn in the beetle family Cerambycidae. It is found in North America.
