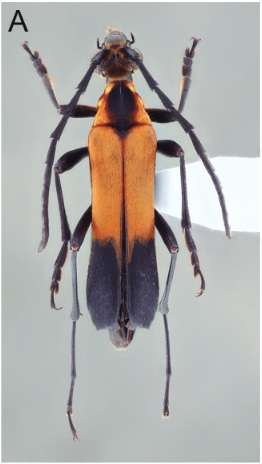

Scientific classification
- Kingdom: Animalia
- Phylum: Arthropoda
- Clade: Pancrustacea
- Class: Insecta
- Order: Coleoptera
- Suborder: Polyphaga
- Infraorder: Cucujiformia
- Family: Cerambycidae
- Genus: Strangalia
- Species: S. melanura

Binomial name
- Strangalia melanura (Redtenbacher, 1867)

Synonyms
- Euryptera melanura Redtenbacher, 1868; Euryptera melanura var. furcata Melzer, 1930; Euryptera dimidiata Redtenbacher, 1868

= Strangalia melanura =

Species of beetle

Strangalia melanura is a species of beetle of the family Cerambycidae. It is found in Brazil (Minas Gerais, Rio de Janeiro, São Paulo, Paraná, Santa Catarina, Rio Grande do Sul).
