= Typocerus gloriosus =

Scientific classification
- Domain: Eukaryota
- Kingdom: Animalia
- Phylum: Arthropoda
- Class: Insecta
- Order: Coleoptera
- Suborder: Polyphaga
- Infraorder: Cucujiformia
- Family: Cerambycidae
- Genus: Typocerus
- Species: T. gloriosus

Binomial name
- Typocerus gloriosus Hopping, 1922

Species of beetle

Typocerus gloriosus is a species of flower longhorn in the beetle family Cerambycidae. It is found in North America.
