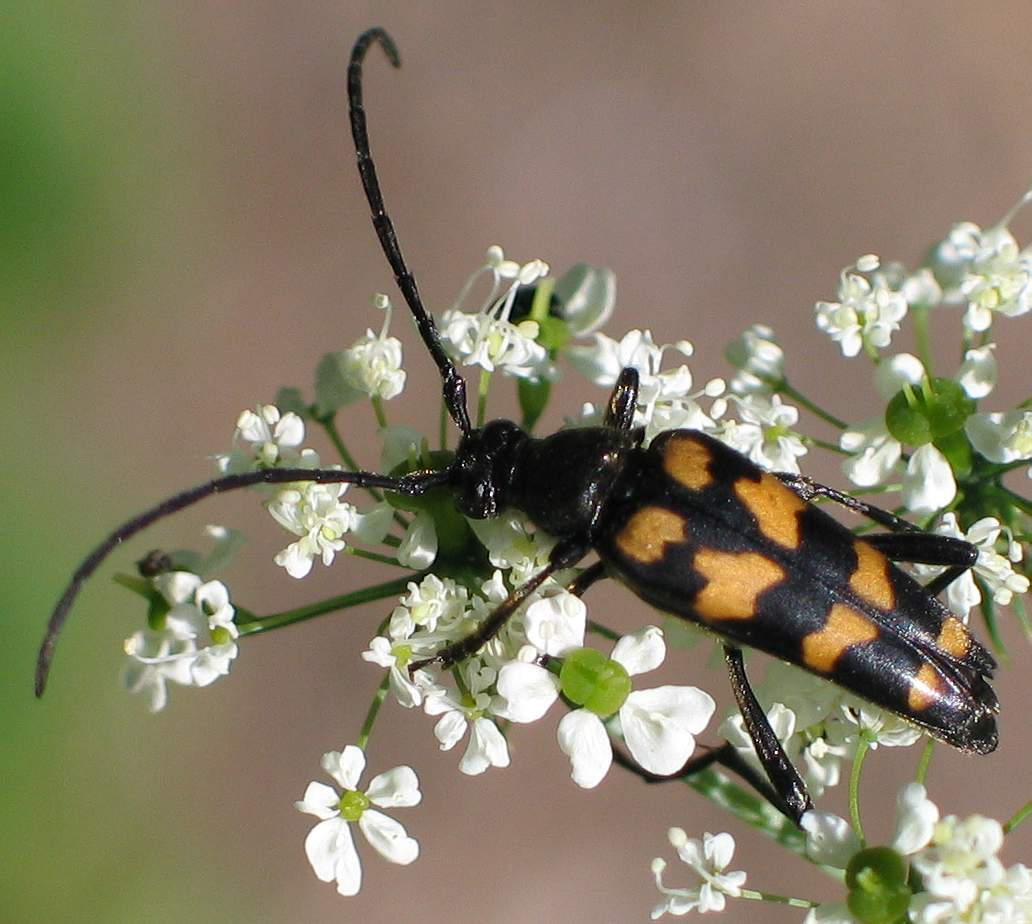
- Strangalia quadrifasciata

Scientific classification
- Kingdom: Animalia
- Phylum: Arthropoda
- Clade: Pancrustacea
- Class: Insecta
- Order: Coleoptera
- Suborder: Polyphaga
- Infraorder: Cucujiformia
- Family: Cerambycidae
- Subfamily: Lepturinae
- Tribe: Lepturini
- Genus: Strangalia; Dejean 1835

Synonyms
- Ophiostomis Gemminger & Harold 1872; Ophistomis Thomson 1857; Strangalina Aurivillius 1912; Strangalidium Giesbert 1997; Sulcatostrangalia K. Ohbayashi 1961

= Strangalia =

Genus of beetles

Strangalia is a genus of beetles in the family Cerambycidae, containing the following species:

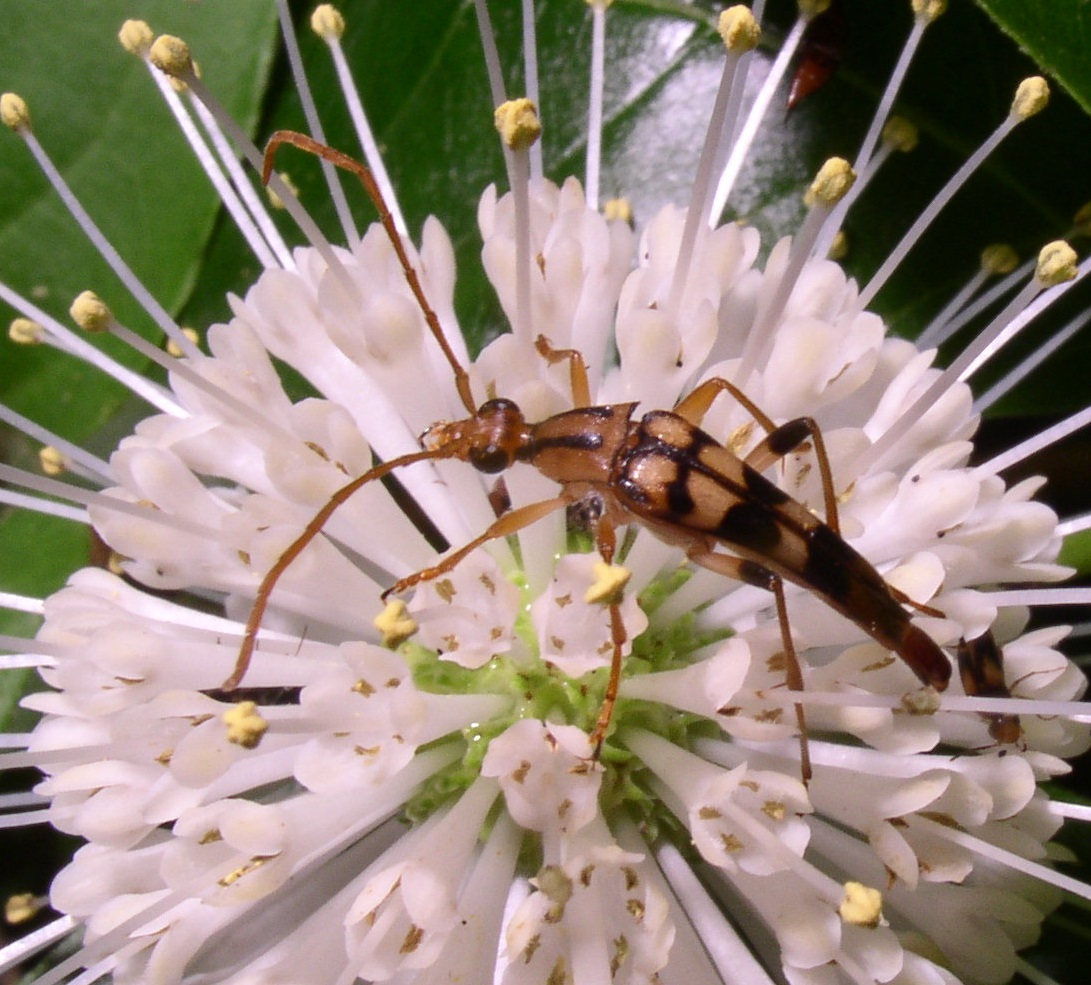
Strangalia luteicornis on buttonbush

- Strangalia acuminata (Olivier, 1795)
- Strangalia albicollis (Pascoe, 1860)
- Strangalia anneae Chemsak & Linsley, 1981
- Strangalia antennata Schaeffer, 1908
- Strangalia attenuata (Linnaeus, 1758
- Strangalia auripilis Chemsak, 1969
- Strangalia baluensis Fisher 1935
- Strangalia beierli Giesbert, 1997
- Strangalia beltii (Bates, 1872)
- Strangalia benitoespinali Chalumeau, 1985
- Strangalia biannulata (Linsley, 1935)
- Strangalia bicolor (Swederus, 1787)
- Strangalia bicolorella Chemsak, 1969
- Strangalia bilineaticollis (Pic, 1915)
- Strangalia bivittata (Bates, 1870)
- Strangalia bonfilsi Villiers, 1979
- Strangalia brachialis (Bates, 1885)
- Strangalia cambrei Linsley & Chemsak, 1976
- Strangalia cantharidis (Chemsak & Linsley, 1976)
- Strangalia cavaventra Chemsak, 1969
- Strangalia cavei Chemsak & Linsley, 1981
- Strangalia chemsaki (Giesbert, 1997)
- Strangalia conicollis (Aurivillius, 1910)
- Strangalia debroizei Chalumeau & Touroult, 2005
- Strangalia dolicops Chemsak, 1969
- Strangalia doyeni Chemsak & Linsley, 1976
- Strangalia eickworti Chemsak & Noguera, 1997
- Strangalia elegans Giesbert, 1997
- Strangalia emaciata (Bates, 1880)
- Strangalia famelica Newman, 1841
- Strangalia flavocincta (Thomson, 1860)
- Strangalia flavocincta (Thomson, 1860)
- Strangalia fortunei Pascoe 1858
- Strangalia fujitai Shimomura 1994
- Strangalia fulvicornis (Bates, 1872)
- Strangalia gerdiana Holzschuh 2008
- Strangalia giesberti Gutierrez & Noguera 2020
- Strangalia gracilis Gressitt 1935
- Strangalia guindoni Giesbert, 1989
- Strangalia hamatipes Giesbert, 1986
- Strangalia hondurae Chemsak & Linsley, 1979
- Strangalia hovorei Giesbert, 1997
- Strangalia ianswifti Hovore & Chemsak, 2005
- Strangalia instabilis Giesbert, 1985
- Strangalia insularis (Fisher, 1932)
- Strangalia koyaensis Matsushita 1933
- Strangalia kunaia (Giesbert, 1997)
- Strangalia lachrymans (Bates, 1885)
- Strangalia lapidicina Giesbert, 1997
- Strangalia linsleyana (Giesbert, 1986)
- Strangalia linsleyi Gressitt 1951
- Strangalia lourdesae Nearns & Swift 2019
- Strangalia lunai Santos-Silva, Van Roie & Jocque 2021
- Strangalia luteicornis (Fabricius, 1775)
- Strangalia lyrata (Redtenbacher, 1867)
- Strangalia mediolineata Pic 1954)
- Strangalia melampus (Bates, 1885)
- Strangalia melanophthisis (Berg, 1889)
- Strangalia melanostoma (Bates, 1870)
- Strangalia melanura (Redtenbacher, 1867)
- Strangalia montivaga Chemsak & Linsley, 1976
- Strangalia monzoni Giesbert, 1997
- Strangalia nigella (Bates, 1872)
- Strangalia occidentalis Linsley & Chemsak, 1976
- Strangalia ochroptera (Bates, 1870)
- Strangalia ohbayashii Vives 2009
- Strangalia opleri Chemsak & Linsley, 1976
- Strangalia palaspina Chemsak, 1969
- Strangalia pallifrons Giesbert, 1997
- Strangalia panama Di Iorio, 2002
- Strangalia panamensis Giesbert, 1985
- Strangalia pectoralis (Bates, 1885)
- Strangalia penrosei Hovore & Chemsak, 2005
- Strangalia picticornis (Bates, 1869)
- Strangalia pseudocantharidis Giesbert, 1985
- Strangalia rubiginosa (Gounelle, 1911)
- Strangalia rubricollis (Bates, 1870)
- Strangalia sallaei (Bates, 1885)
- Strangalia saltator (Bates, 1885)
- Strangalia semifulva (Bates, 1870)
- Strangalia sexalbonotata Pic 1955
- Strangalia sexnotata Haldeman, 1847
- Strangalia sexocellata Hovore & Chemsak, 2005
- Strangalia sinaloae Chemsak & Linsley, 1981
- Strangalia solitaria Haldeman 1847
- Strangalia splendida (Aurivillius, 1920)
- Strangalia strigosa Newman, 1841
- Strangalia suavis (Melzer, 1926)
- Strangalia succincta (Redtenbacher, 1867)
- Strangalia sumatrensis (Gahan, 1907)
- Strangalia takakuwai Vives 2009
- Strangalia takeuchii Matsushita & Tamanuki 1935
- Strangalia thoracica (Fleutiaux & Sallé, 1889)
- Strangalia turnbowi Hovore & Chemsak, 2005
- Strangalia veracruzana Hovore & Chemsak, 2005
- Strangalia virilis LeConte, 1873
- Strangalia westcotti Chemsak & Linsley, 1976
- Strangalia xanthomelaena Monne & Monne, 2005
- Strangalia xanthotela (Bates, 1892)
- Strangalia yoryinethae Nearns & Swift 2019
- Strangalia zacapensis Giesbert, 1997
- Strangalia zikani (Melzer, 1922)
