= Strangalia occidentalis =

Scientific classification
- Domain: Eukaryota
- Kingdom: Animalia
- Phylum: Arthropoda
- Class: Insecta
- Order: Coleoptera
- Suborder: Polyphaga
- Infraorder: Cucujiformia
- Family: Cerambycidae
- Genus: Strangalia
- Species: S. occidentalis

Binomial name
- Strangalia occidentalis Linsley & Chemsak, 1976

Species of beetle

Strangalia occidentalis is a species of flower longhorn in the beetle family Cerambycidae. It is found in Central America and North America.
