= Strangalia strigosa =

Scientific classification
- Domain: Eukaryota
- Kingdom: Animalia
- Phylum: Arthropoda
- Class: Insecta
- Order: Coleoptera
- Suborder: Polyphaga
- Infraorder: Cucujiformia
- Family: Cerambycidae
- Genus: Strangalia
- Species: S. strigosa

Binomial name
- Strangalia strigosa Newman, 1841

Species of beetle

Strangalia strigosa is a species of flower longhorn in the beetle family Cerambycidae. It is found in North America.
