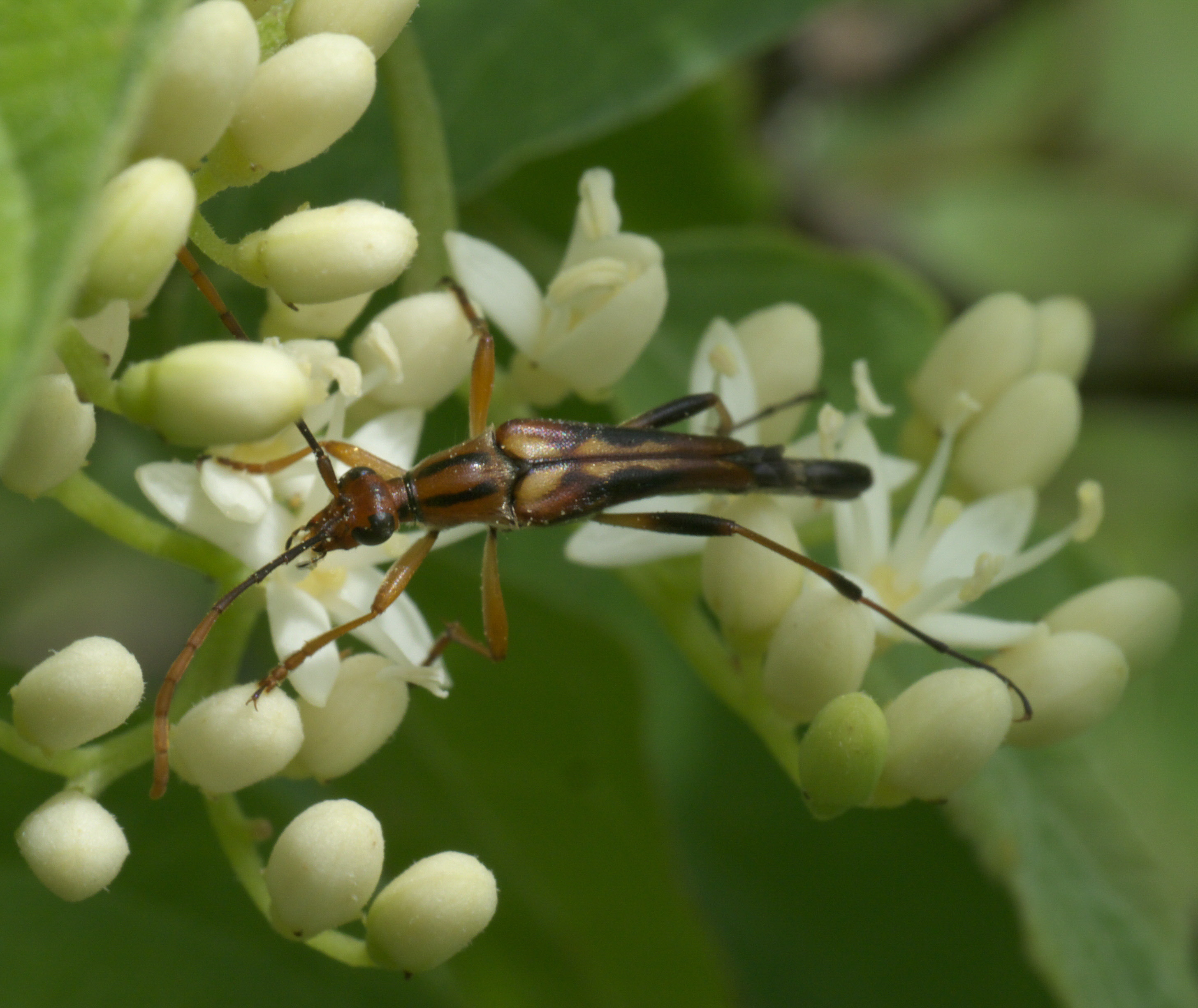

Scientific classification
- Domain: Eukaryota
- Kingdom: Animalia
- Phylum: Arthropoda
- Class: Insecta
- Order: Coleoptera
- Suborder: Polyphaga
- Infraorder: Cucujiformia
- Family: Cerambycidae
- Genus: Strangalia
- Species: S. famelica

Binomial name
- Strangalia famelica Newman, 1841

= Strangalia famelica =

Species of beetle

Strangalia famelica is a species of flower longhorn in the beetle family Cerambycidae. It is found in North America.

== Subspecies ==
These two subspecies belong to the species Strangalia famelica:

- Strangalia famelica famelica Newman, 1841
- Strangalia famelica solitaria Haldeman, 1847
