= Typocerus deceptus =

Scientific classification
- Domain: Eukaryota
- Kingdom: Animalia
- Phylum: Arthropoda
- Class: Insecta
- Order: Coleoptera
- Suborder: Polyphaga
- Infraorder: Cucujiformia
- Family: Cerambycidae
- Genus: Typocerus
- Species: T. deceptus

Binomial name
- Typocerus deceptus Knull, 1929

Species of beetle

Typocerus deceptus is a species of flower longhorn in the family Cerambycidae. It is found in North America.
