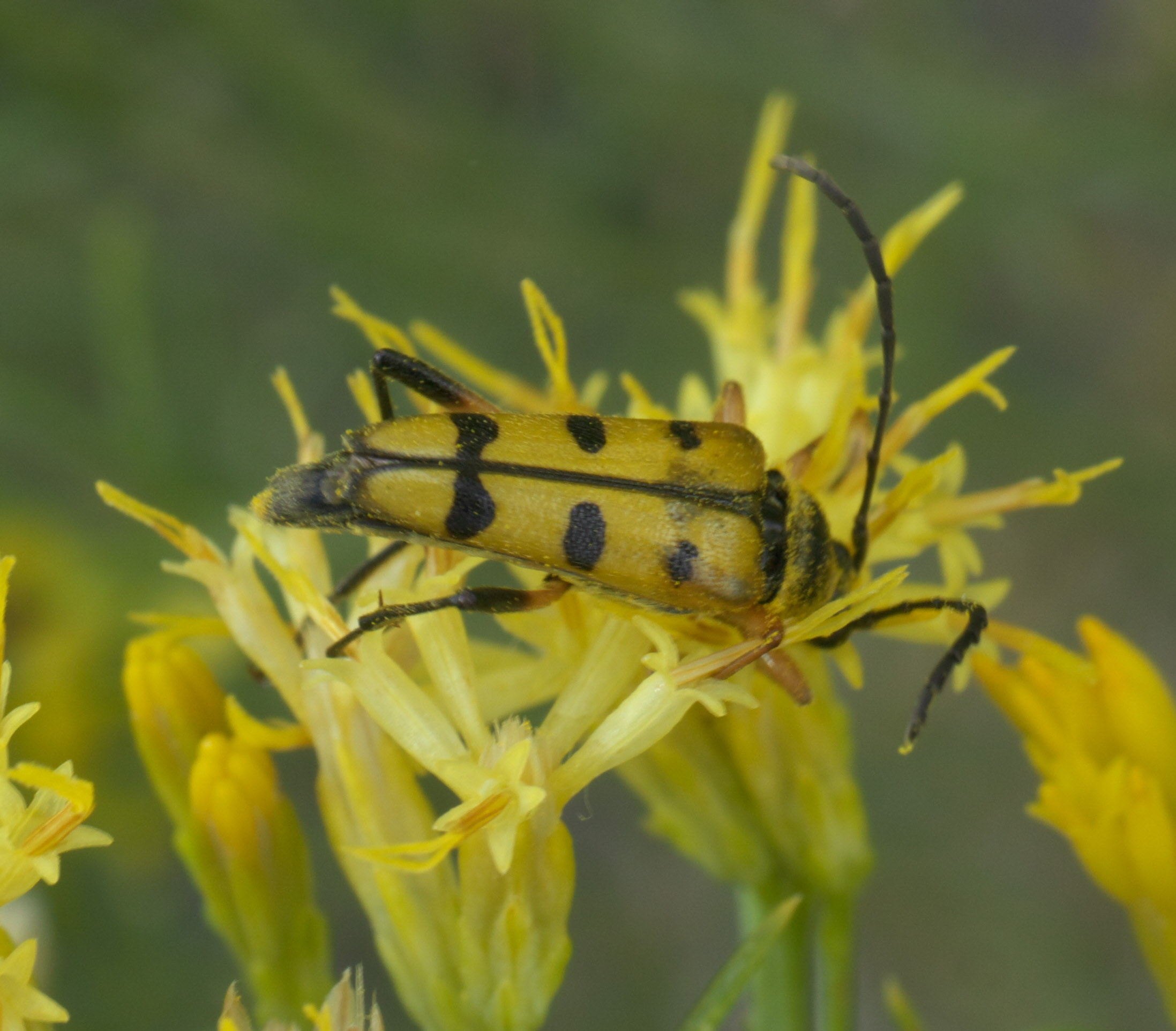

Scientific classification
- Domain: Eukaryota
- Kingdom: Animalia
- Phylum: Arthropoda
- Class: Insecta
- Order: Coleoptera
- Suborder: Polyphaga
- Infraorder: Cucujiformia
- Family: Cerambycidae
- Genus: Typocerus
- Species: T. balteatus

Binomial name
- Typocerus balteatus Horn, 1878

= Typocerus balteatus =

Species of beetle

Typocerus balteatus is a species of flower longhorn in the beetle family Cerambycidae. It is found in North America.

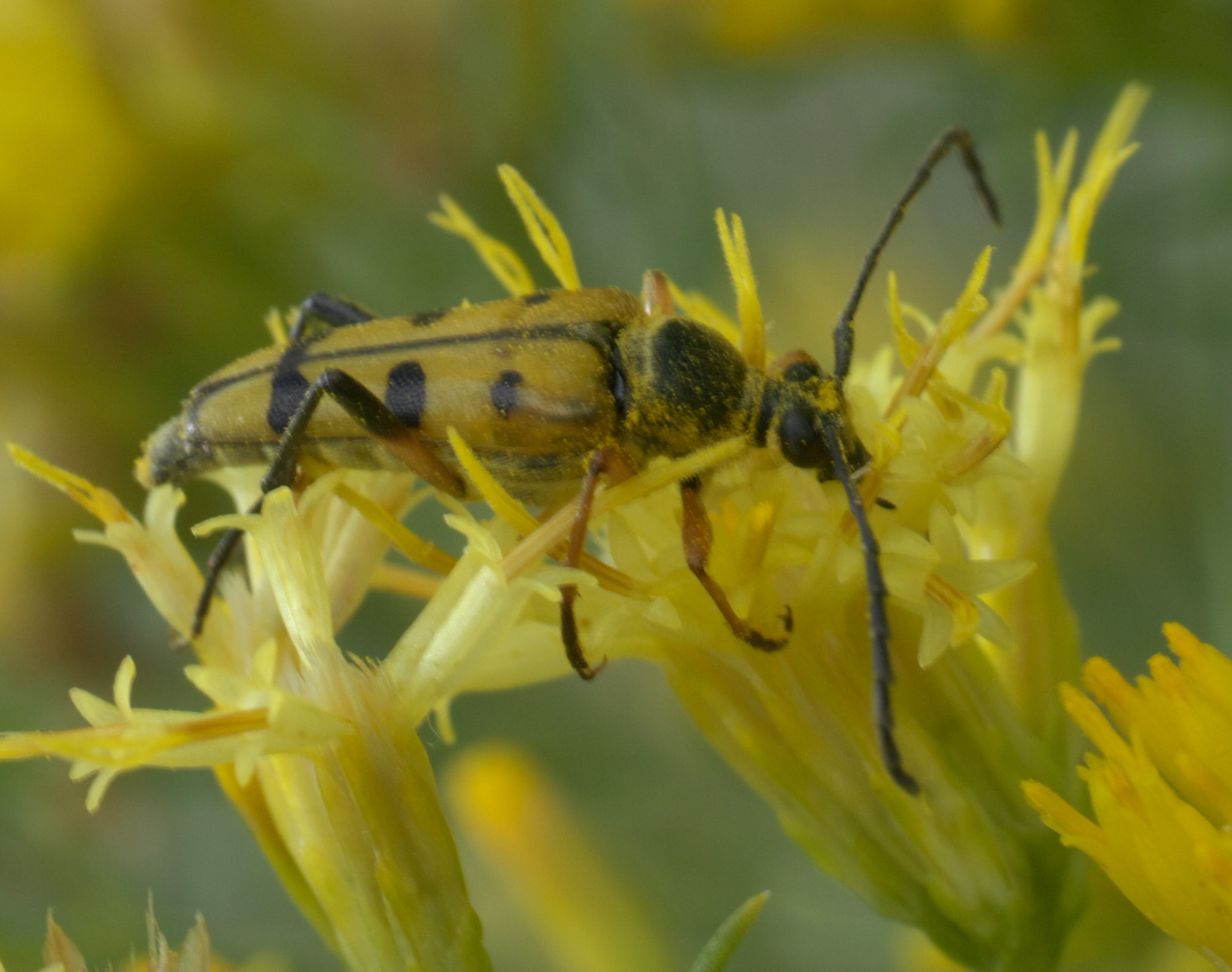

== Subspecies ==
These two subspecies belong to the species Typocerus balteatus:

- Typocerus balteatus balteatus Lewis, 2001
- Typocerus balteatus diana Lewis, 2001
