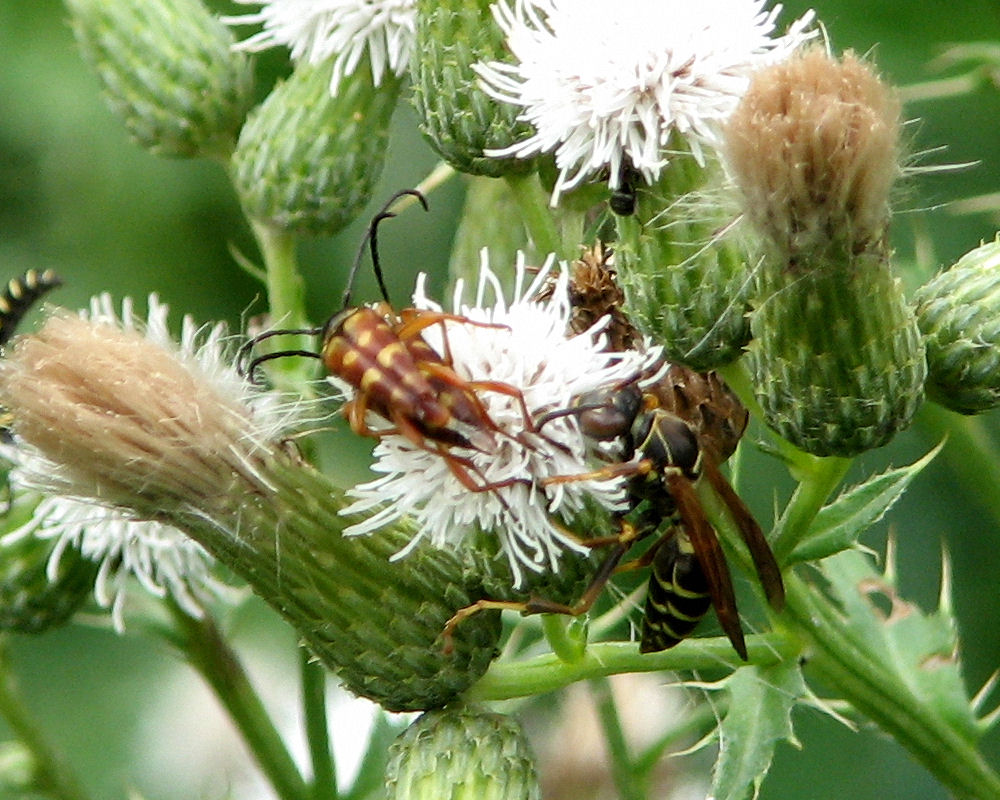
- Pair of Banded Longhorn Beetles (Typocercus velutinus)

Scientific classification
- Kingdom: Animalia
- Phylum: Arthropoda
- Class: Insecta
- Order: Coleoptera
- Suborder: Polyphaga
- Infraorder: Cucujiformia
- Family: Cerambycidae
- Tribe: Lepturini
- Genus: Typocerus; LeConte, 1850

= Typocerus =

Genus of beetles

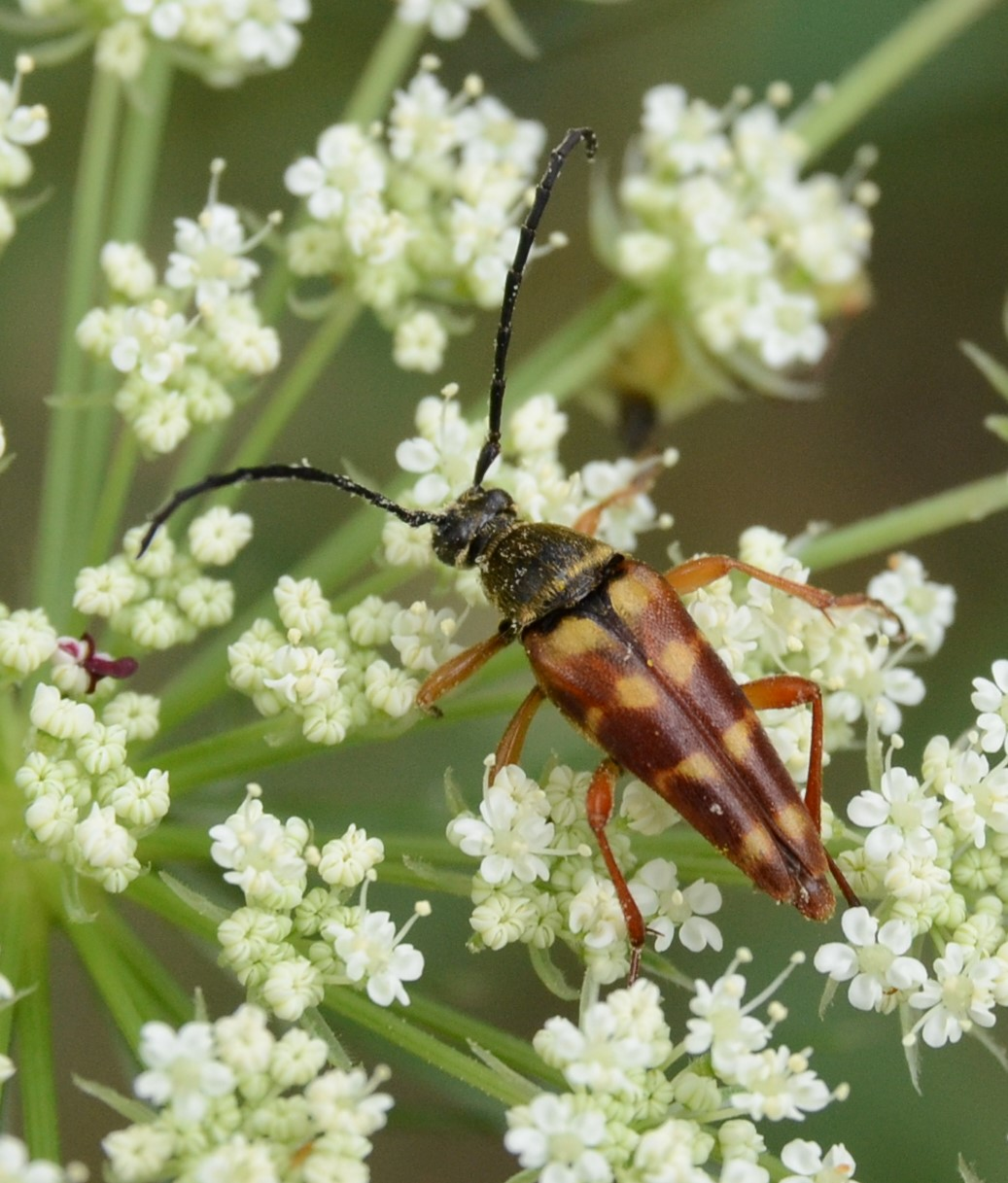
T. velutinus

Typocerus is a genus of beetles in the family Cerambycidae, containing the following species:

== Species ==
- Typocerus acuticauda Casey, 1913
- Typocerus badius (Newman, 1841)
- Typocerus balteatus Horn, 1878
- Typocerus confluens Casey, 1913
- Typocerus deceptus Knull, 1929
- Typocerus fulvocinctus Knull, 1956
- Typocerus gloriosus Hopping, 1922
- Typocerus lugubris (Say, 1824)
- Typocerus lunulatus (Swederus, 1787)
- Typocerus octonotatus (Haldeman, 1847)
- Typocerus serraticornis Linsley & Chemsak, 1976
- Typocerus sinuatus (Newman, 1841) – Notch-tipped Flower Longhorn
- Typocerus sparsus LeConte, 1878
- Typocerus velutinus (Newman, 1841) – Banded Longhorn Beetle
- Typocerus zebra (Olivier, 1795) – Zebra Longhorn Beetle
