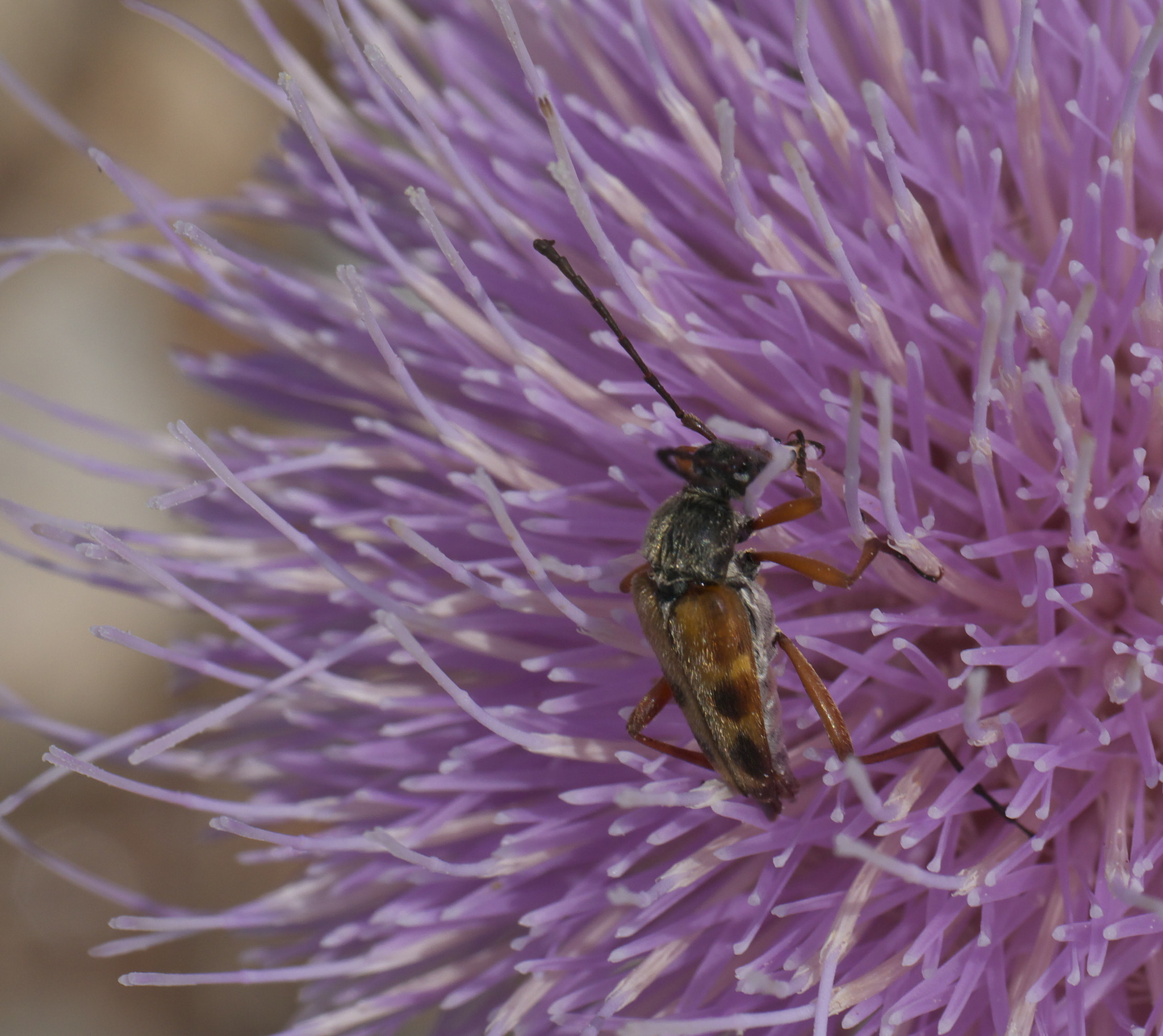
- Typocerus octonotatus, Oklahoma

Scientific classification
- Domain: Eukaryota
- Kingdom: Animalia
- Phylum: Arthropoda
- Class: Insecta
- Order: Coleoptera
- Suborder: Polyphaga
- Infraorder: Cucujiformia
- Family: Cerambycidae
- Genus: Typocerus
- Species: T. octonotatus

Binomial name
- Typocerus octonotatus (Haldeman, 1847)

Synonyms
- Typocerus arapahoe Casey, 1924

= Typocerus octonotatus =

Species of beetle

Typocerus octonotatus is a species of flower longhorn in the beetle family Cerambycidae. It is found in North America.
