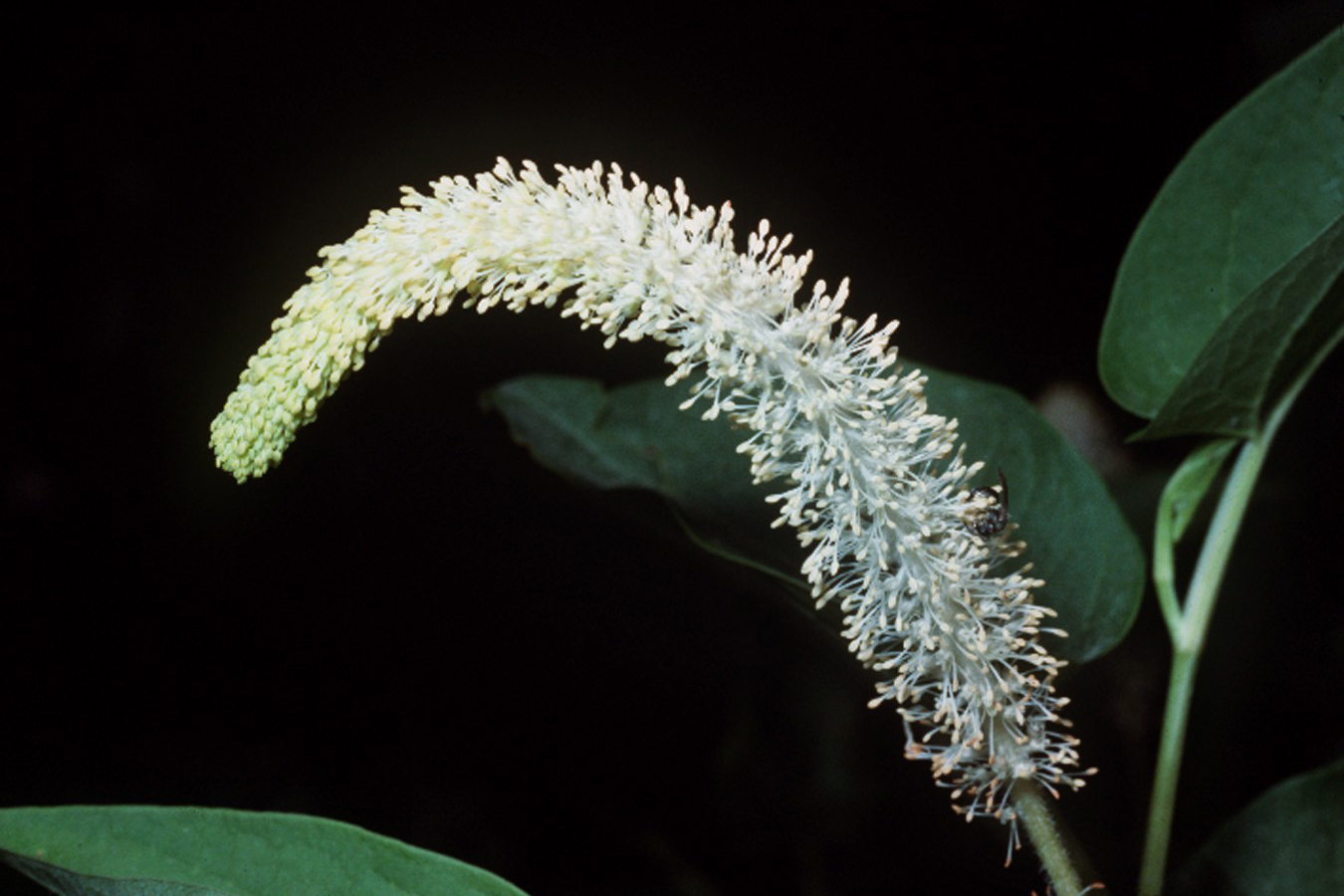
- Saururus cernuus

Scientific classification
- Kingdom: Plantae
- Clade: Tracheophytes
- Clade: Angiosperms
- Clade: Magnoliids
- Order: Piperales
- Family: Saururaceae; Martynov

Genera
- Anemopsis; Gymnotheca; Houttuynia; Saururus

= Saururaceae =

Saururaceae Temporal range: Campanian - recent

Family of flowering plants

Saururaceae is a plant family comprising four genera and seven species of herbaceous flowering plants native to eastern and southern Asia and North America. The family has been recognised by most taxonomists, and is sometimes known as the "lizard's-tail family". The APG IV system (2016; unchanged from the 2009 APG III system, the 2003 APG II system and the 1998 APG system) assigned it to the order Piperales in the clade magnoliids.

- Saururaceae
  - - Saururus
    - Gymnotheca
  - - Anemopsis
    - Houttuynia

== Species ==
- Anemopsis californica (Nutt.) Hook. & Arn. (yerba mansa). – North America.
- Gymnotheca chinensis Decne. – Asia.
- Gymnotheca involucrata S. J. Pei. – Asia.
- Houttuynia cordata Thunberg. – Asia.
- Houttuynia emeiensis Z.Y.Zhu & S.L.Zhang - Asia.
- Saururus cernuus L. (lizard's tail, water-dragon)– North America.
- Saururus chinensis (Loureiro) Baillon. – Asia.
- †Saururus tuckerae - Middle Eocene
- †Saururus aquilae - Late Cretaceous (Campanian)
- †Saururus stoobensis - Miocene
