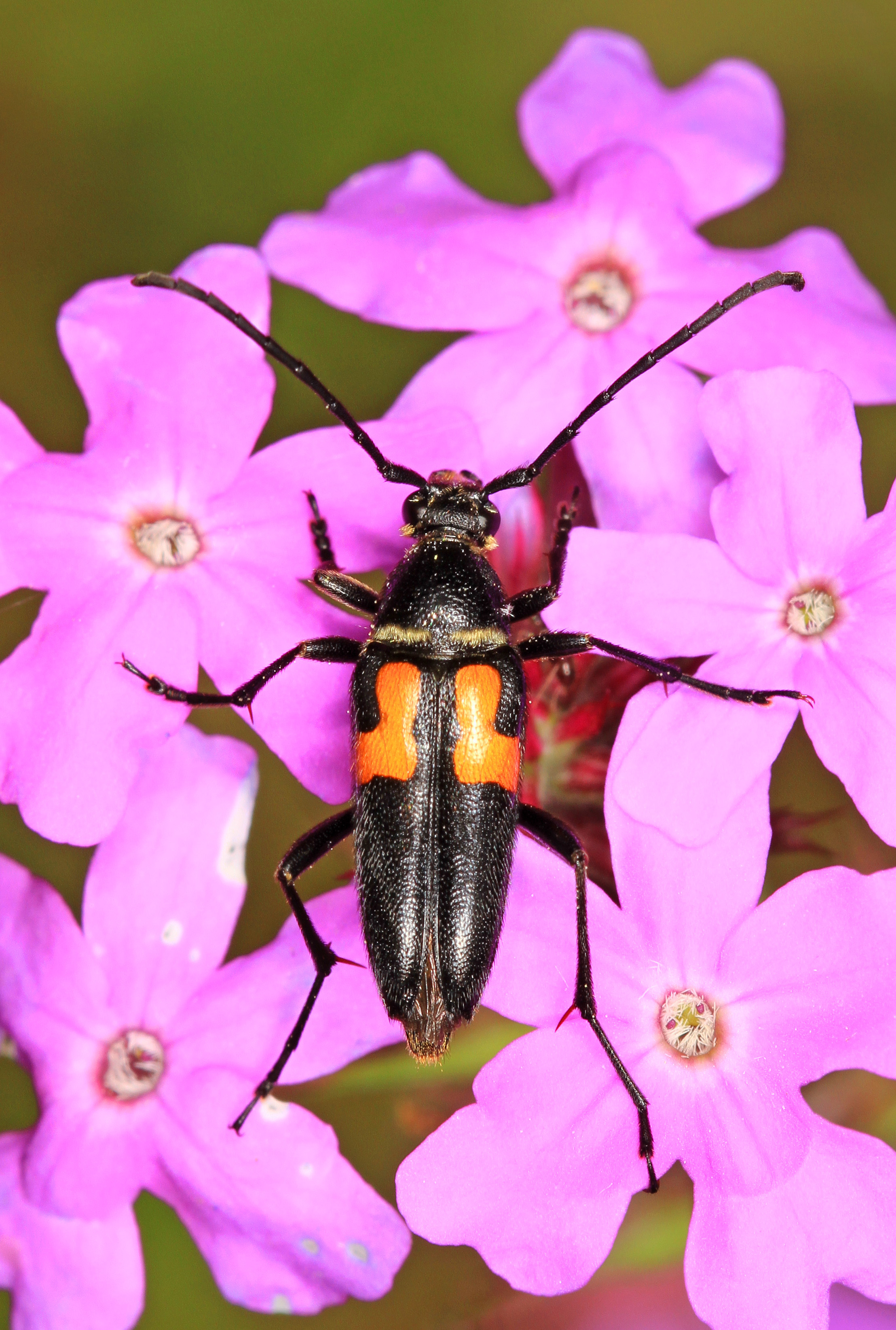

Scientific classification
- Kingdom: Animalia
- Phylum: Arthropoda
- Clade: Pancrustacea
- Class: Insecta
- Order: Coleoptera
- Suborder: Polyphaga
- Infraorder: Cucujiformia
- Family: Cerambycidae
- Genus: Typocerus
- Species: T. lunulatus

Binomial name
- Typocerus lunulatus (Swederus, 1787)

= Typocerus lunulatus =

Species of beetle

Typocerus lunulatus is a species of flower longhorn beetle of the family Cerambycidae. It is found in North America.

== Subspecies ==
These two subspecies belong to the species Typocerus lunulatus:

- Typocerus lunulatus lunulatus (Swederus, 1787)
- Typocerus lunulatus texanus Linsley & Chemsak, 1976 (Texas stallingia beetle)
