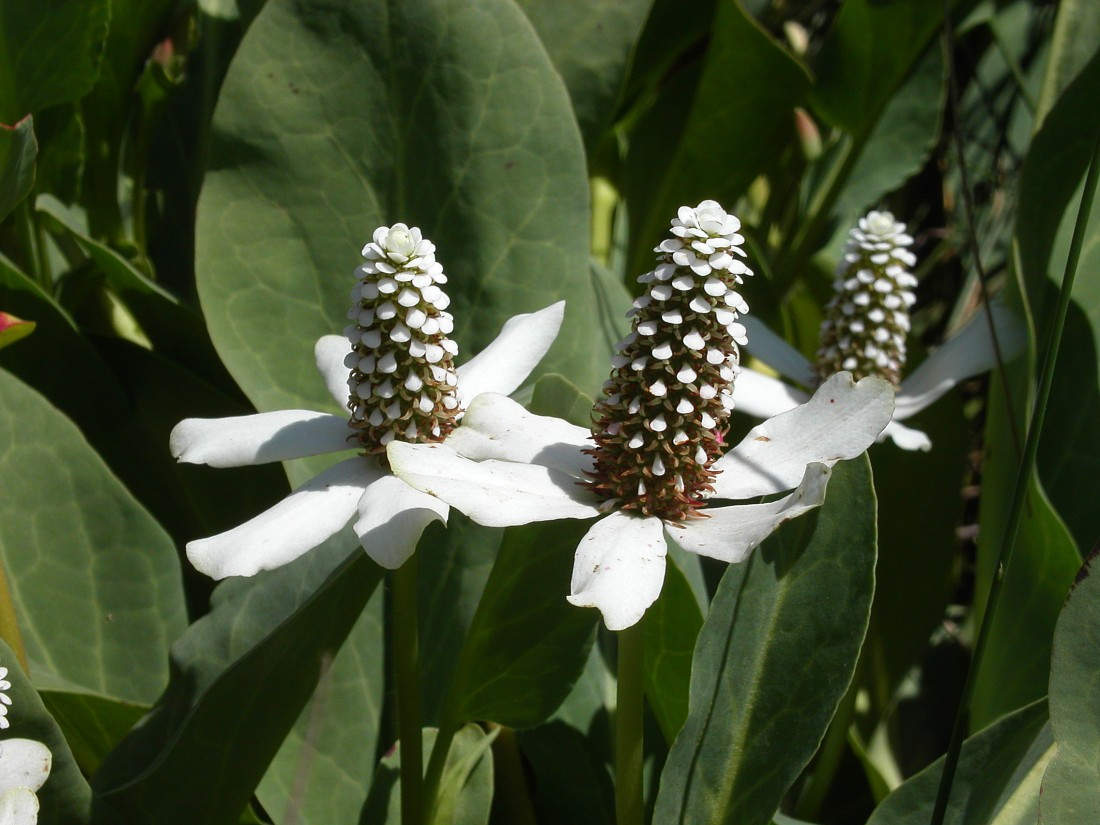

Conservation status
- Secure (NatureServe)

Scientific classification
- Kingdom: Plantae
- Clade: Embryophytes
- Clade: Tracheophytes
- Clade: Angiosperms
- Clade: Magnoliids
- Order: Piperales
- Family: Saururaceae
- Genus: Anemopsis; Hook. & Arn.
- Species: A. californica

Binomial name
- Anemopsis californica (Nutt.) Hook. & Arn.

Synonyms
- Anemia Nutt., 1838 (non Sw., 1806), nom. inval.. Type species: Anemia californica Nutt., 1838.; Anemia californica Nutt., 1838.; Anemia intermedia Copel. ex M.E.Jones; Anemopsis bolanderi C. DC., 1872; Anemopsis californica var. subglabra Kelso 1932; Anemopsis ludovici-salvatoris Willk., 1877; Houttuynia bolanderi Benth. & Hook.f., 1880; Houttuynia californica Benth. & Hook.f., 1880

= Anemopsis =

Genus of flowering plants

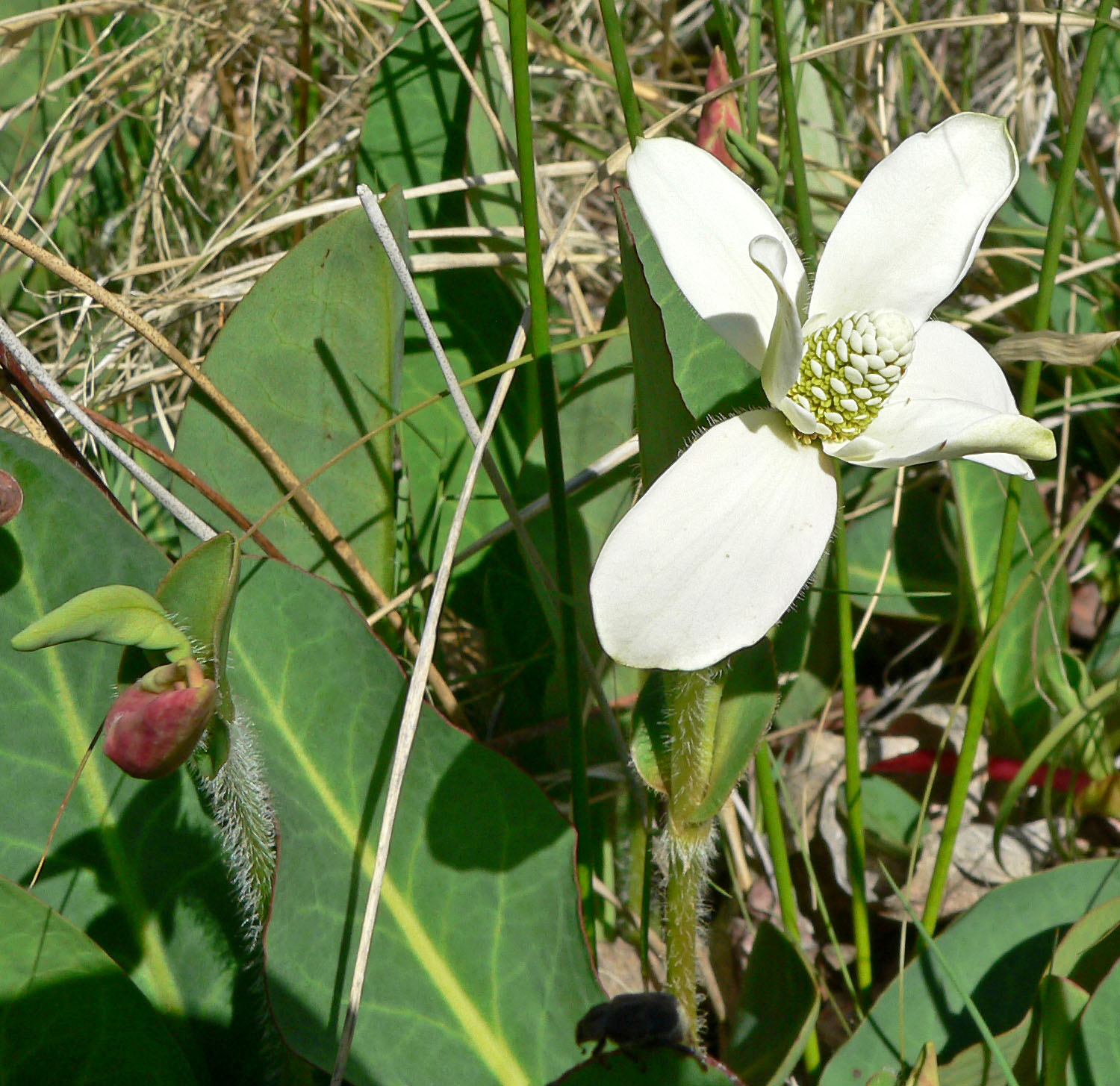

The monotypic genus Anemopsis has only one species, Anemopsis californica, with the common names yerba mansa or lizard tail.

It is a perennial herb in the lizard tail family (Saururaceae) and prefers very wet soil or shallow water.

== Range and habitat ==
It is native to southwestern North America in northwest Mexico and the Southwestern United States from California to Oklahoma and Texas to Kansas to Oregon. It grows in wet, alkaline marsh and creek edges.

== Description ==
=== Leaves and stems ===
As it matures, the visible part of the plant develops red stains, eventually turning bright red in the fall.

=== Inflorescence and fruit ===
Yerba mansa is showy in spring when in bloom. The iconic white "flowers" (actually reduced inflorescences, or pseudanthia) are borne in early spring, and are surrounded by 4–9 large white bracts.

Similar to the family Asteraceae, what appears to be a single bloom is in reality a dense cluster of individually small flowers borne in an inflorescence. In this species the inflorescence is conical and has five to ten large white bracts beneath it, so that along with the tiny white florets, the whole structure is quite striking when it blooms in spring. The conical structure develops into a single, tough fruit that can be carried downstream to spread the tiny, pepper-like seeds.

== Common name ==
In her book on herbs of the southwestern USA, Dr. Soule discusses the common name. "Yerba mansa is one of those names which confounds linguists. Yerba is Spanish for herb, and thus one would think that mansa is also from Spanish as well, but all indications point to the fact that it is not. Mansa means tame, peaceful, calm in Spanish, and the plant has no sedative effect, nor did local people ever use it as a calming agent. Its primary use is as an antimicrobial, antibacterial, and antifungal. The most likely explanation is that mansa is a Spanish alteration of the original native word for the plant, now lost in the depths of time." Hartweg, who collected it at León, Guanajuato in 1837, recorded the local name as yerba del manso. It is also known as yerba del manso in northern Baja California. The word "manso" could be short for "remanso" (backwater) which would agree with the areas where the plant thrives.

== Uses ==
=== Medicinal ===
Yerba mansa is used as an antimicrobial, an antibacterial, and to treat vaginal candidiasis.

Yerba mansa is used to treat inflammation of the mucous membranes, swollen gums and sore throat. An infusion of roots can be taken as a diuretic to treat rheumatic diseases like gout by ridding the body of excess uric acid, which causes painful inflammation of the joints. Yerba mansa prevents the buildup of uric acid crystals in the kidneys which could cause kidney stones if left untreated. A powder of dried root can be sprinkled on infected areas to alleviate athlete's foot or diaper rash.

Yerba mansa is versatile. It can be taken orally as a tea, tincture, infusion or dried in capsule form. It can be used externally for soaking inflamed or infected areas. It can be ground and used as a dusting powder. Some people in Las Cruces, New Mexico use the leaves to make a poultice to relieve muscle swelling and inflammation. The leaves and roots have also been used to heal and disinfect wounds and sores.

Yerba mansa is the midwife's panacea. The Good Book of Alice the Midwife enumerates the striking symmetry of benefits between this sub-tropic wetland plant in riparian ecology and microbiome diversity.

=== Crafts ===
- Dried floral structures are used in dried arrangements.
- Dried plant parts (leaves, floral structure) emit a spicy fragrance and are used in potpourri.

=== Horticulture ===
- In the deserts of California, yerba mansa is being used as turf in public parks and ground cover in gardens.
