= Strangalia fulvicornis =

Scientific classification
- Kingdom: Animalia
- Phylum: Arthropoda
- Clade: Pancrustacea
- Class: Insecta
- Order: Coleoptera
- Suborder: Polyphaga
- Infraorder: Cucujiformia
- Family: Cerambycidae
- Genus: Strangalia
- Species: S. fulvicornis

Binomial name
- Strangalia fulvicornis (Bates, 1872)

Synonyms
- Ophistomis fulvicornis Bates, 1872; Ophistomis rustica Melzer, 1926; Ophistomis variabilis Melzer, 1926; Ophistomis flavovittata Melzer, 1926

Species of beetle

Strangalia fulvicornis is a species of beetle of the family Cerambycidae. It is found in Brazil (Goiás, Minas Gerais, Espírito Santo, Rio de Janeiro, São Paulo, Paraná, Santa Catarina, Rio Grande do Sul), Paraguay, Argentina (Misiones) and Uruguay.
