= Strangalia acuminata =

Scientific classification
- Kingdom: Animalia
- Phylum: Arthropoda
- Clade: Pancrustacea
- Class: Insecta
- Order: Coleoptera
- Suborder: Polyphaga
- Infraorder: Cucujiformia
- Family: Cerambycidae
- Genus: Strangalia
- Species: S. acuminata

Binomial name
- Strangalia acuminata (Olivier, 1795)

Synonyms
- Strangalia emaciata Newman, 1841; Strangalia unicolor Haldeman, 1847

Species of beetle

Strangalia acuminata is a species of flower longhorn in the beetle family Cerambycidae. It is found in North America.
