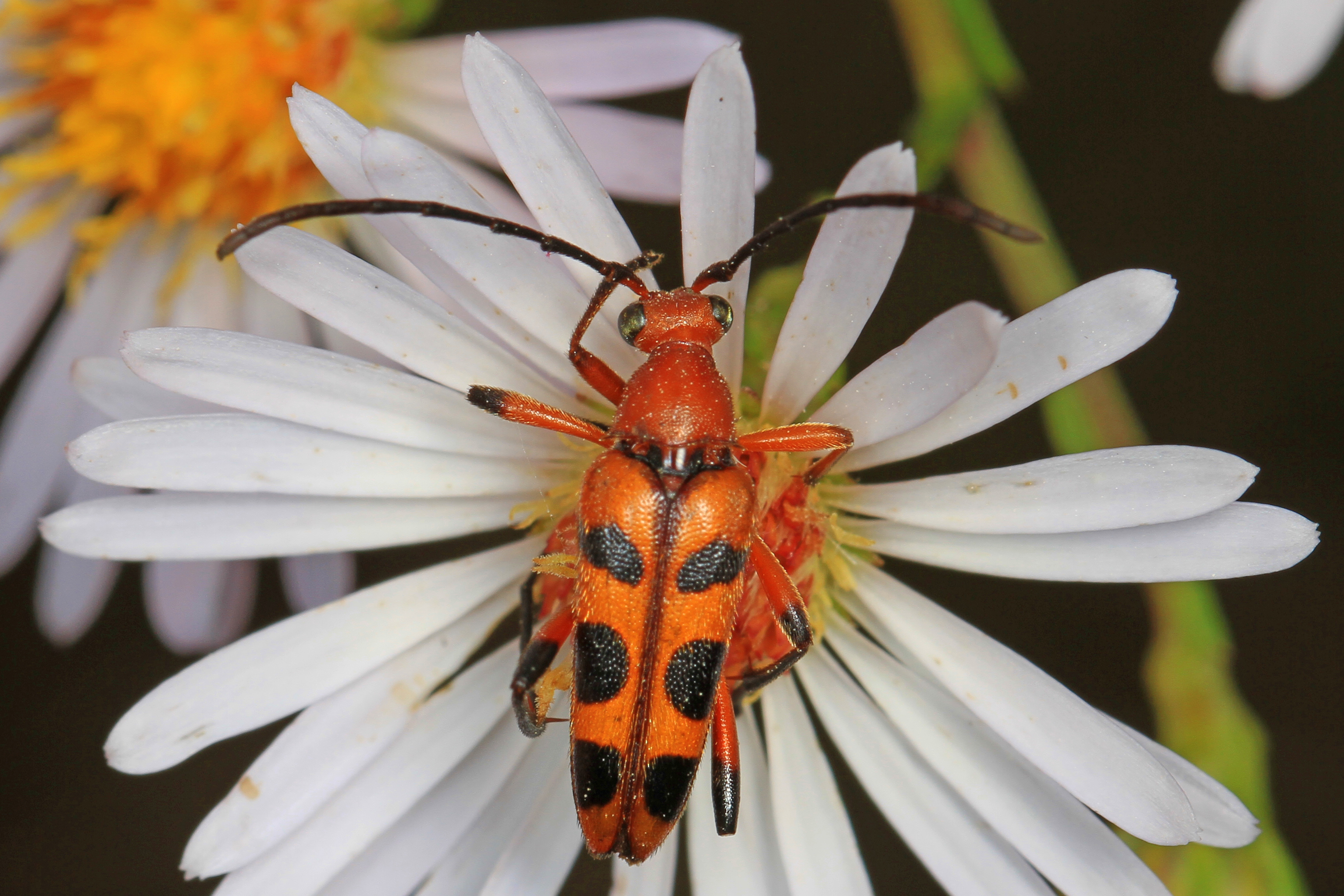

Scientific classification
- Domain: Eukaryota
- Kingdom: Animalia
- Phylum: Arthropoda
- Class: Insecta
- Order: Coleoptera
- Suborder: Polyphaga
- Infraorder: Cucujiformia
- Family: Cerambycidae
- Genus: Strangalia
- Species: S. sexnotata

Binomial name
- Strangalia sexnotata Haldeman, 1847

Synonyms
- Strangalia evanescens (Casey, 1913); Strangalia montana Casey, 1891; Strangalia texana (Casey, 1913)

= Strangalia sexnotata =

Species of beetle

Strangalia sexnotata, the six-spotted flower strangalia, is a species of flower longhorn in the beetle family Cerambycidae. It is found in North America.
