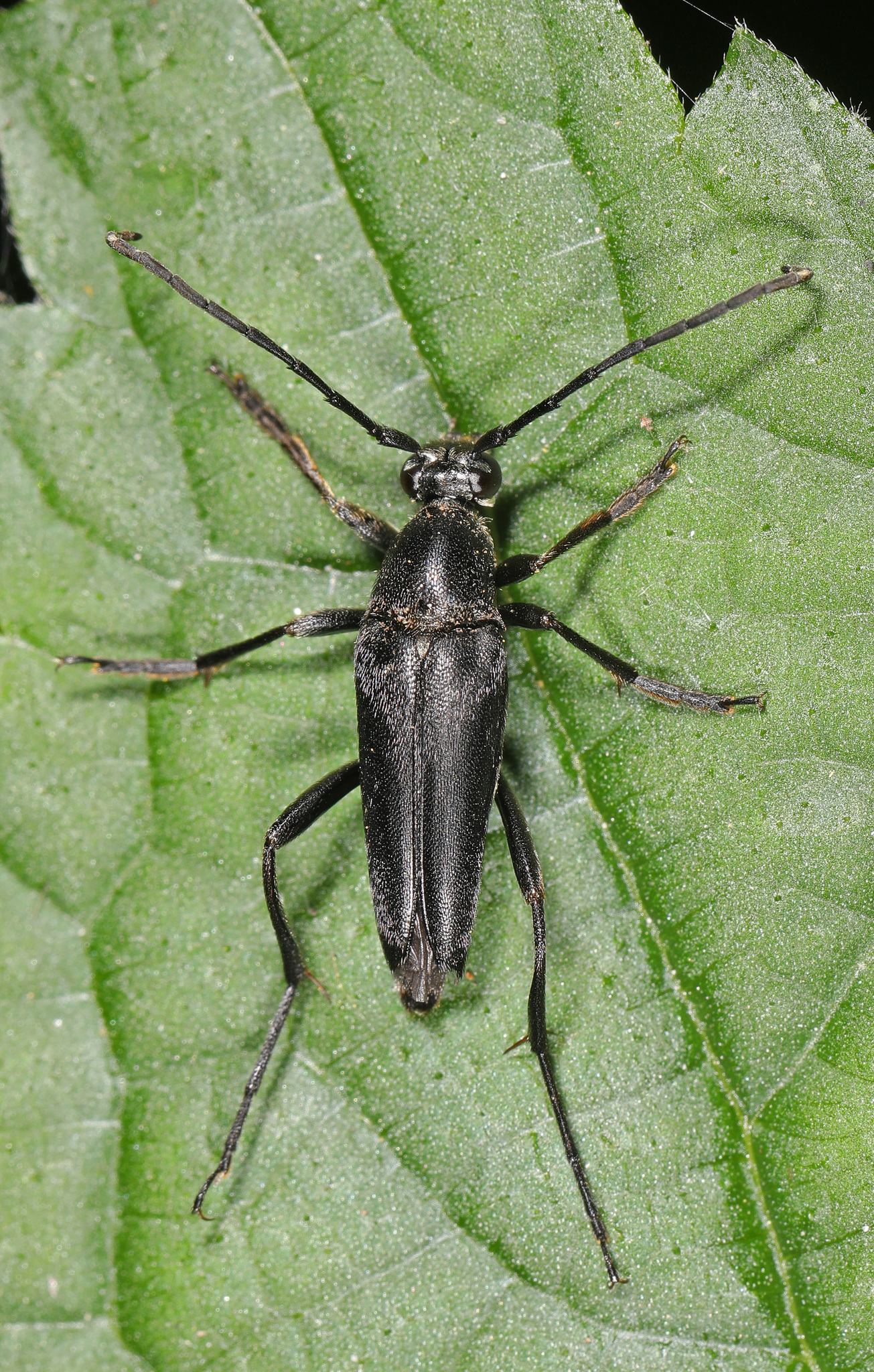

Scientific classification
- Domain: Eukaryota
- Kingdom: Animalia
- Phylum: Arthropoda
- Class: Insecta
- Order: Coleoptera
- Suborder: Polyphaga
- Infraorder: Cucujiformia
- Family: Cerambycidae
- Genus: Typocerus
- Species: T. lugubris

Binomial name
- Typocerus lugubris (Say, 1824)

= Typocerus lugubris =

Species of beetle

Typocerus lugubris is a species of flower longhorn in the beetle family Cerambycidae. It is found in North America. It has been observed mating on Saururus cernuus, with the female consuming pollen from the plant.
