= Typocerus sinuatus =

Scientific classification
- Domain: Eukaryota
- Kingdom: Animalia
- Phylum: Arthropoda
- Class: Insecta
- Order: Coleoptera
- Suborder: Polyphaga
- Infraorder: Cucujiformia
- Family: Cerambycidae
- Genus: Typocerus
- Species: T. sinuatus

Binomial name
- Typocerus sinuatus (Newman, 1841)

Synonyms
- Typocerus brunnicornis LeConte, 1873; Typocerus brunnicornis inflatus Knull, 1959

Species of beetle

Typocerus sinuatus, the notch-tipped flower longhorn, is a species of flower longhorn in the beetle family Cerambycidae.
