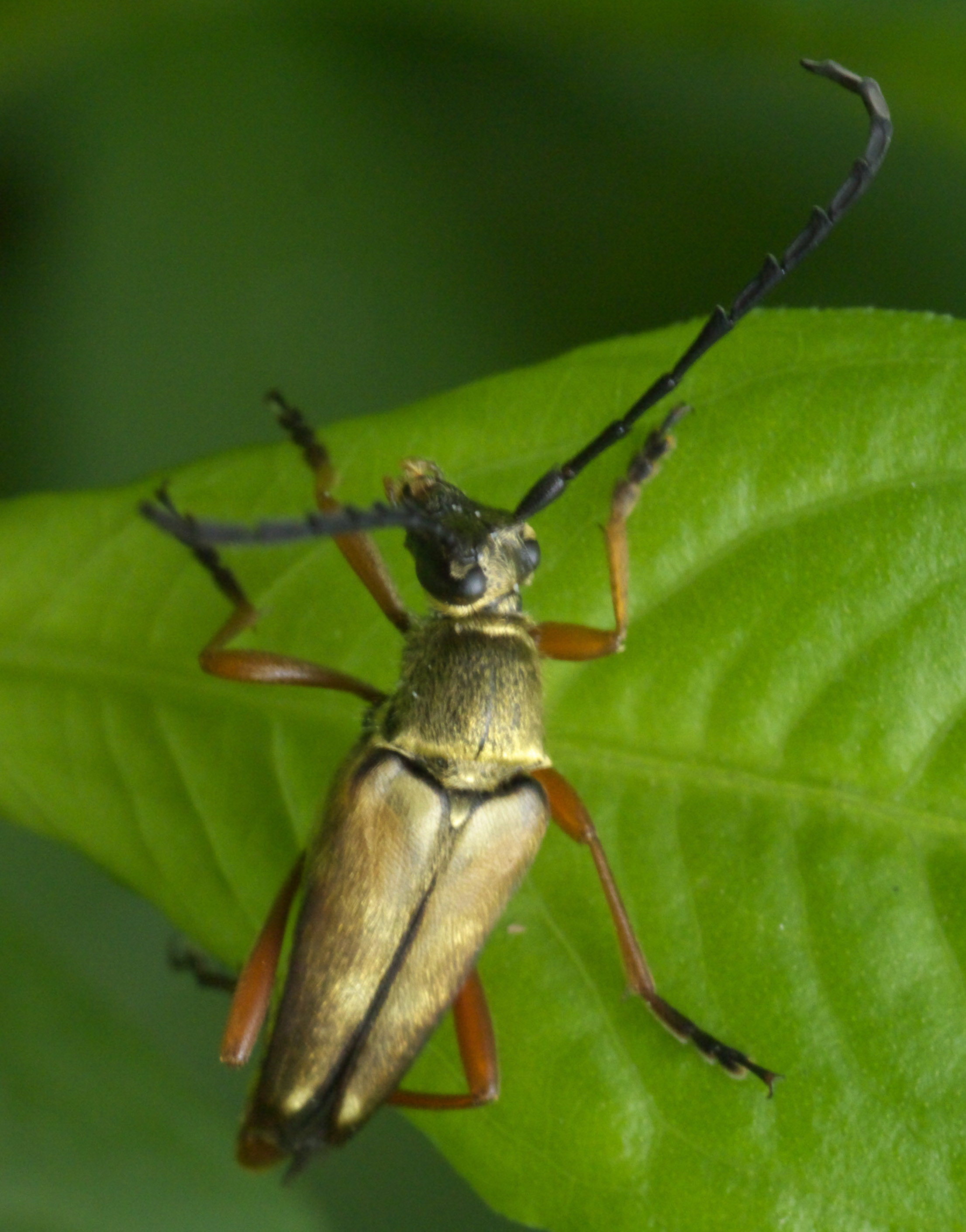

Scientific classification
- Kingdom: Animalia
- Phylum: Arthropoda
- Class: Insecta
- Order: Coleoptera
- Suborder: Polyphaga
- Infraorder: Cucujiformia
- Family: Cerambycidae
- Genus: Typocerus
- Species: T. acuticauda

Binomial name
- Typocerus acuticauda Casey, 1913

= Typocerus acuticauda =

Species of beetle

Typocerus acuticauda is a species of flower longhorn in the beetle family Cerambycidae. It is found in North America.

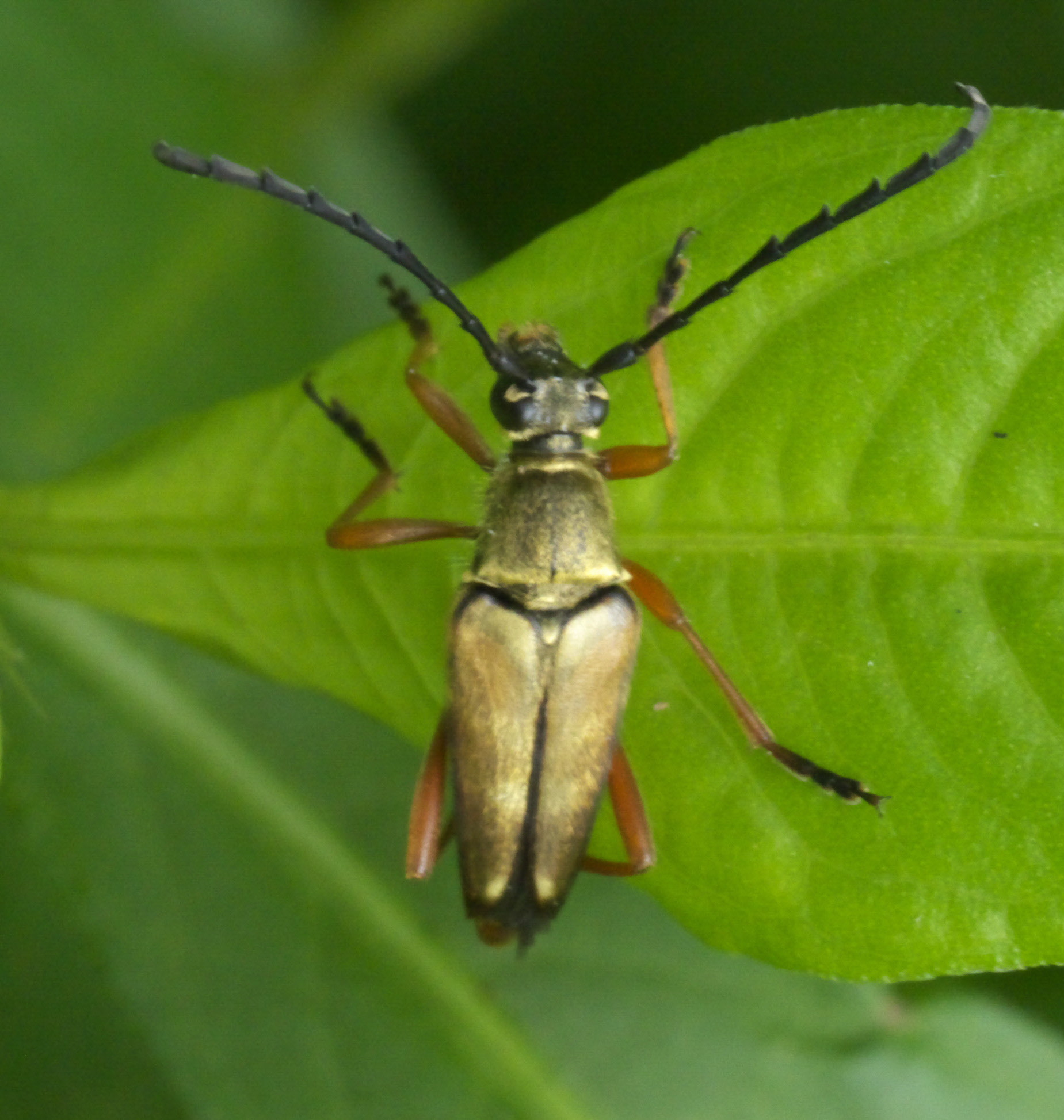

== Subspecies ==
These two subspecies belong to the species Typocerus acuticauda:

- Typocerus acuticauda acuticauda Casey, 1913
- Typocerus acuticauda standishi Knull, 1938
