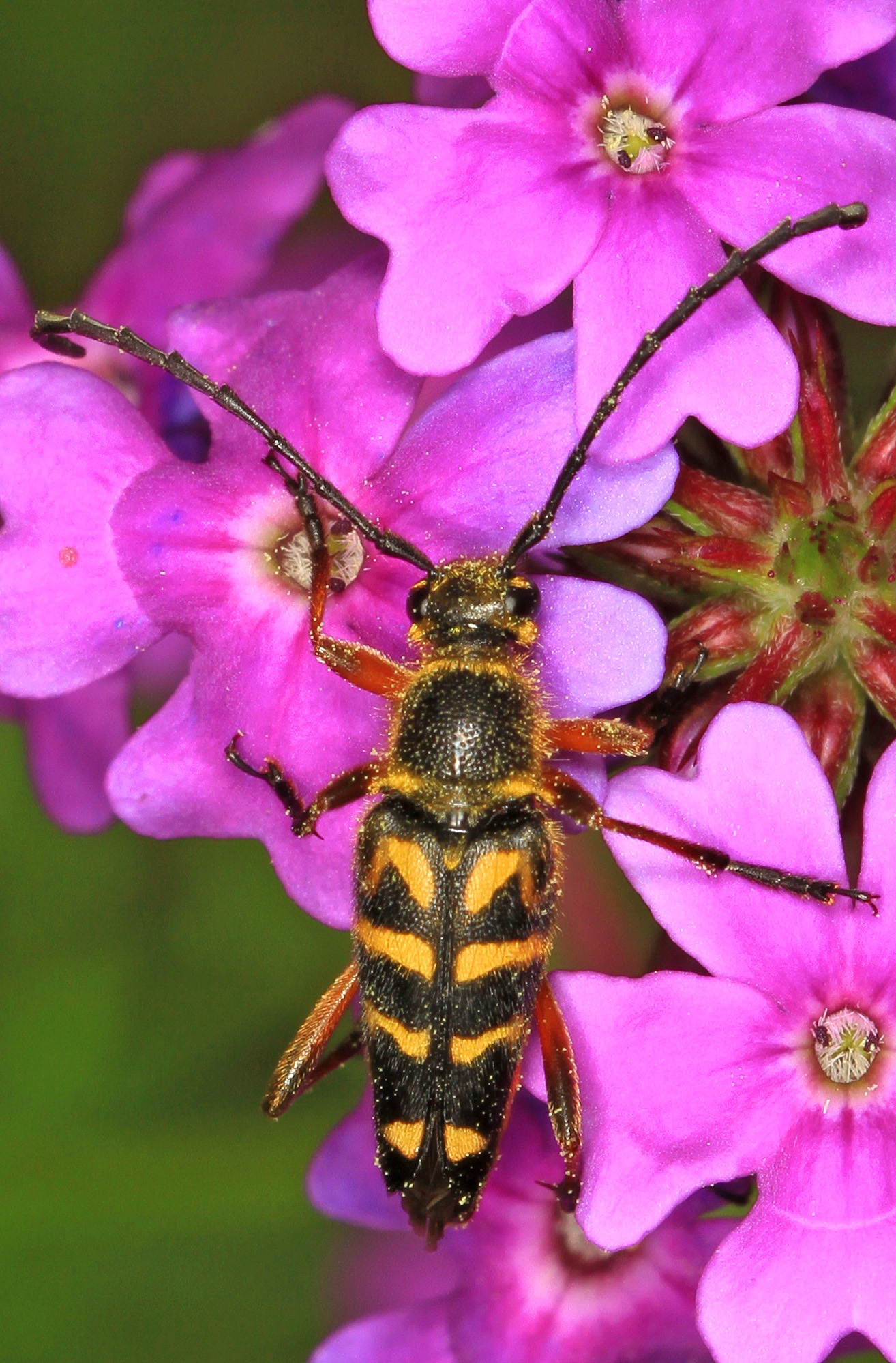

Scientific classification
- Kingdom: Animalia
- Phylum: Arthropoda
- Clade: Pancrustacea
- Class: Insecta
- Order: Coleoptera
- Suborder: Polyphaga
- Infraorder: Cucujiformia
- Family: Cerambycidae
- Genus: Typocerus
- Species: T. zebra

Binomial name
- Typocerus zebra (Olivier, 1795)

Synonyms
- Typocerus aurigera (Newman, 1841); Typocerus carolina (Weber, 1801); Typocerus zebrata (Fabricius, 1801)

= Typocerus zebra =

Species of beetle

Typocerus zebra, the zebra longhorn, is a species of flower longhorn in the beetle family Cerambycidae. It is found in North America.

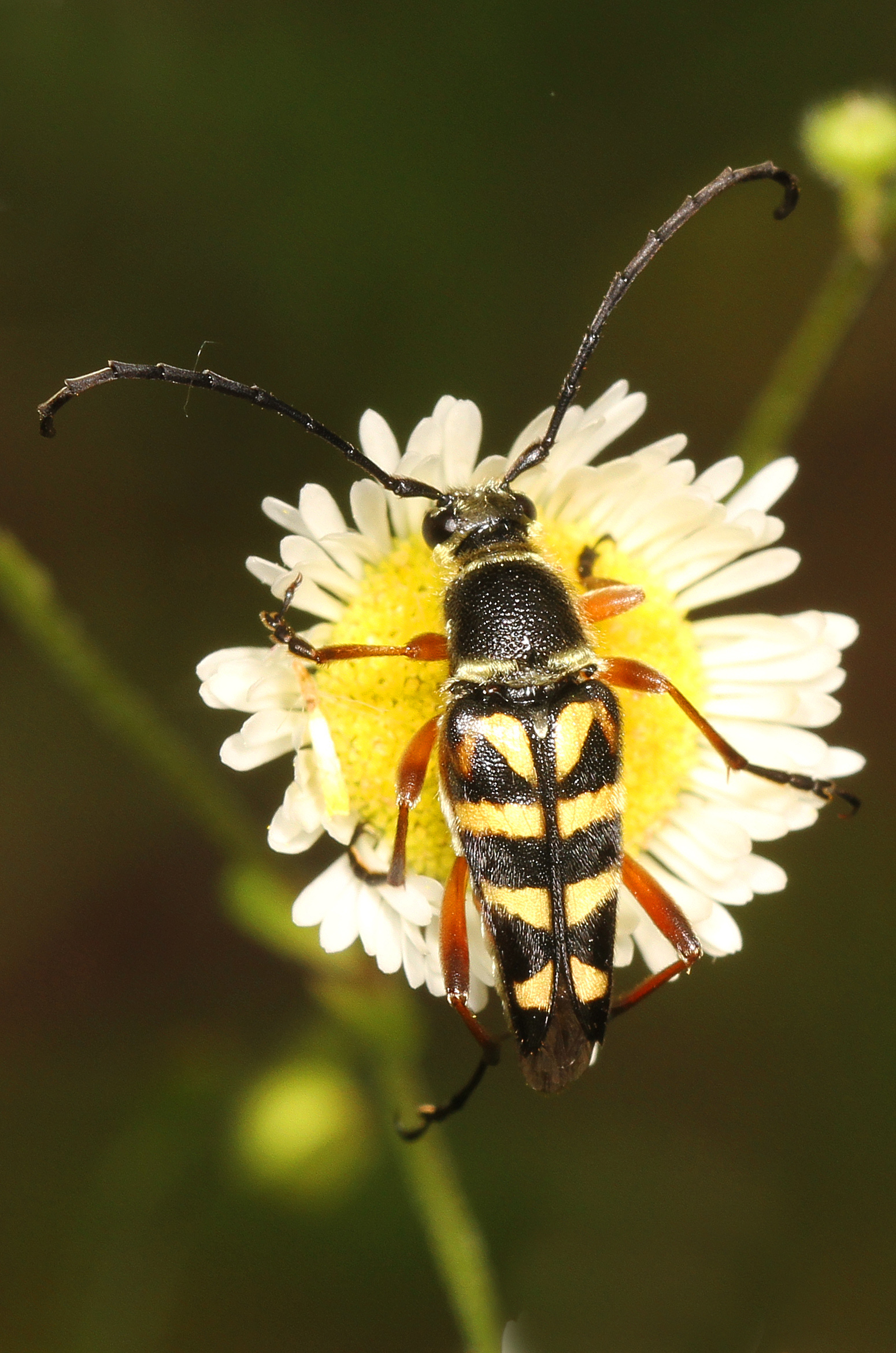
Zebra longhorn, Typocerus zebra

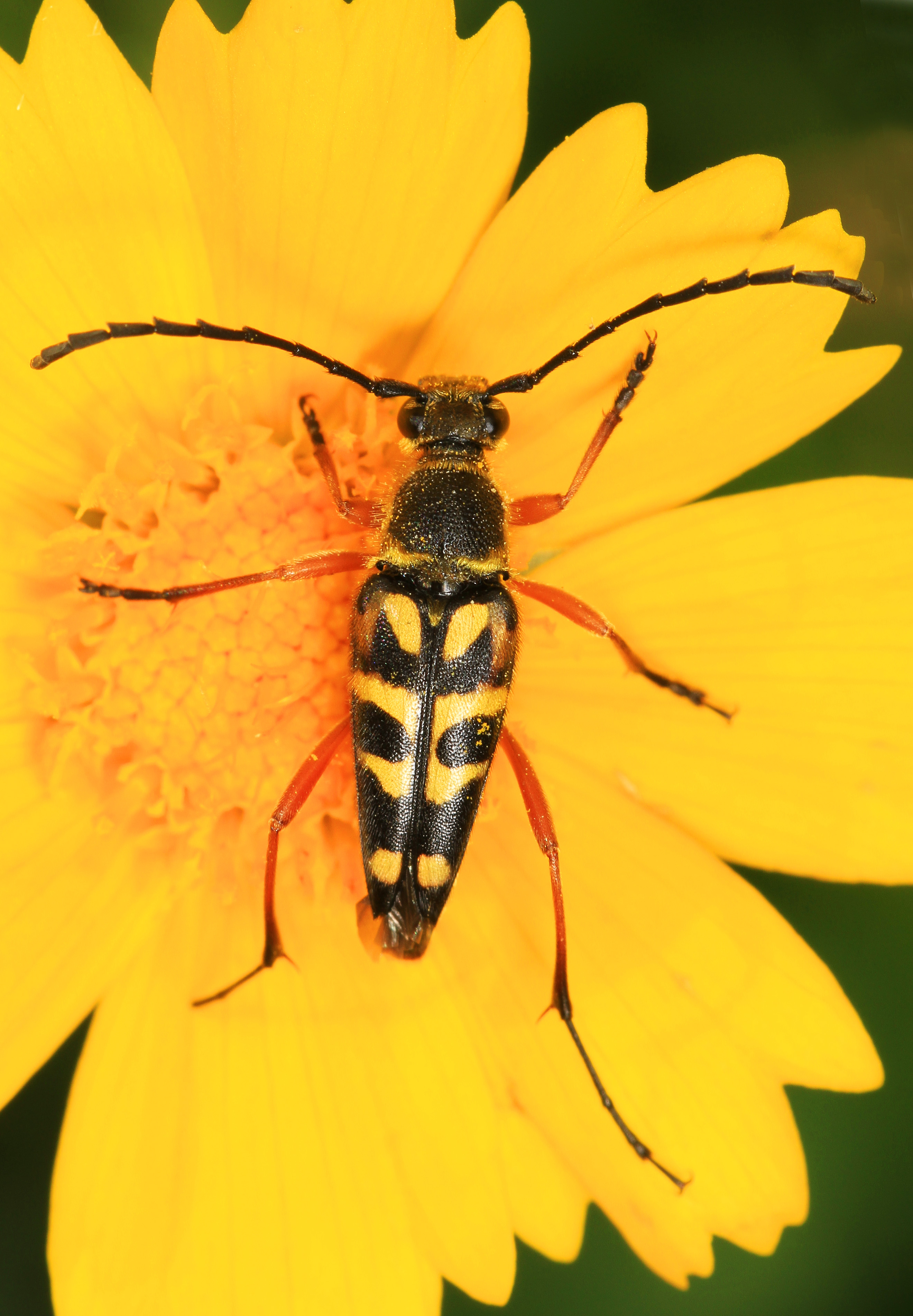
Zebra longhorn, Typocerus zebra
