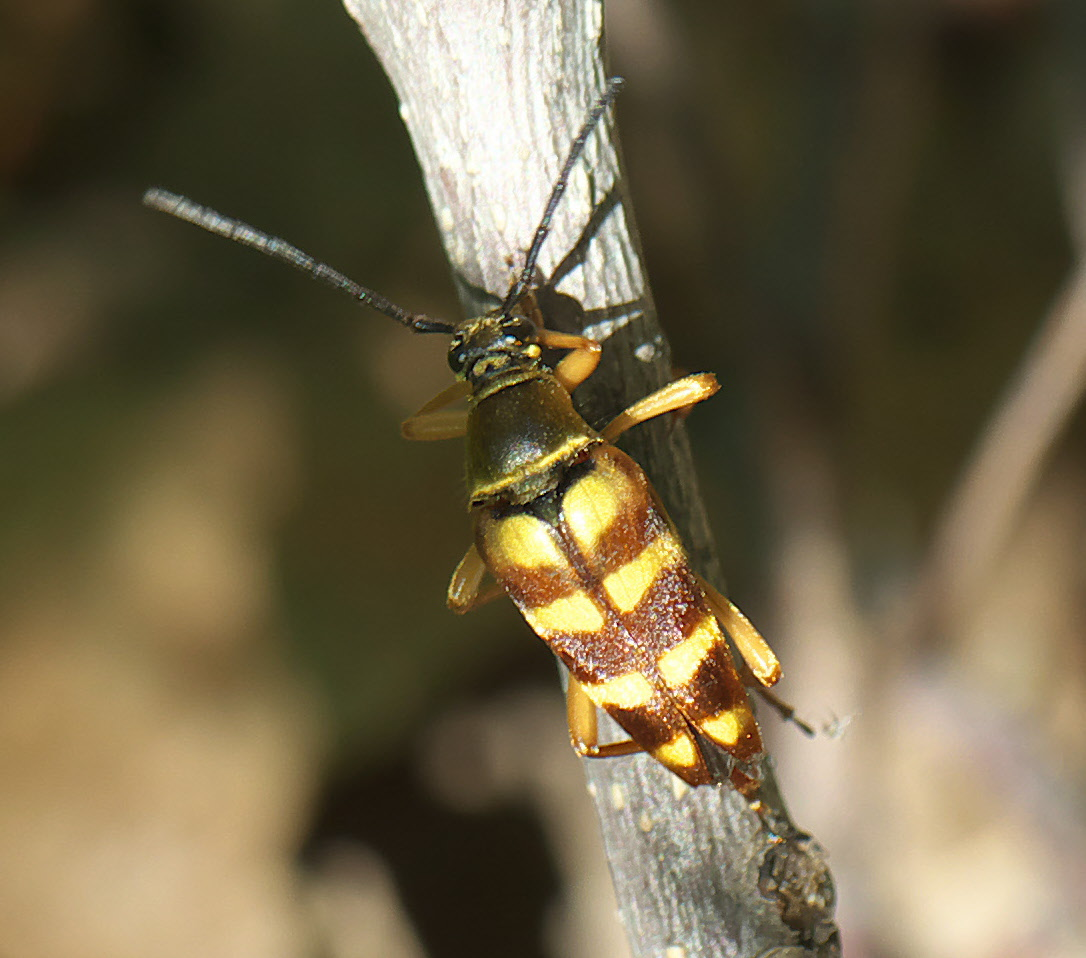

Scientific classification
- Kingdom: Animalia
- Phylum: Arthropoda
- Clade: Pancrustacea
- Class: Insecta
- Order: Coleoptera
- Suborder: Polyphaga
- Infraorder: Cucujiformia
- Family: Cerambycidae
- Genus: Typocerus
- Species: T. velutinus

Binomial name
- Typocerus velutinus (Olivier, 1795)

= Typocerus velutinus =

Species of beetle

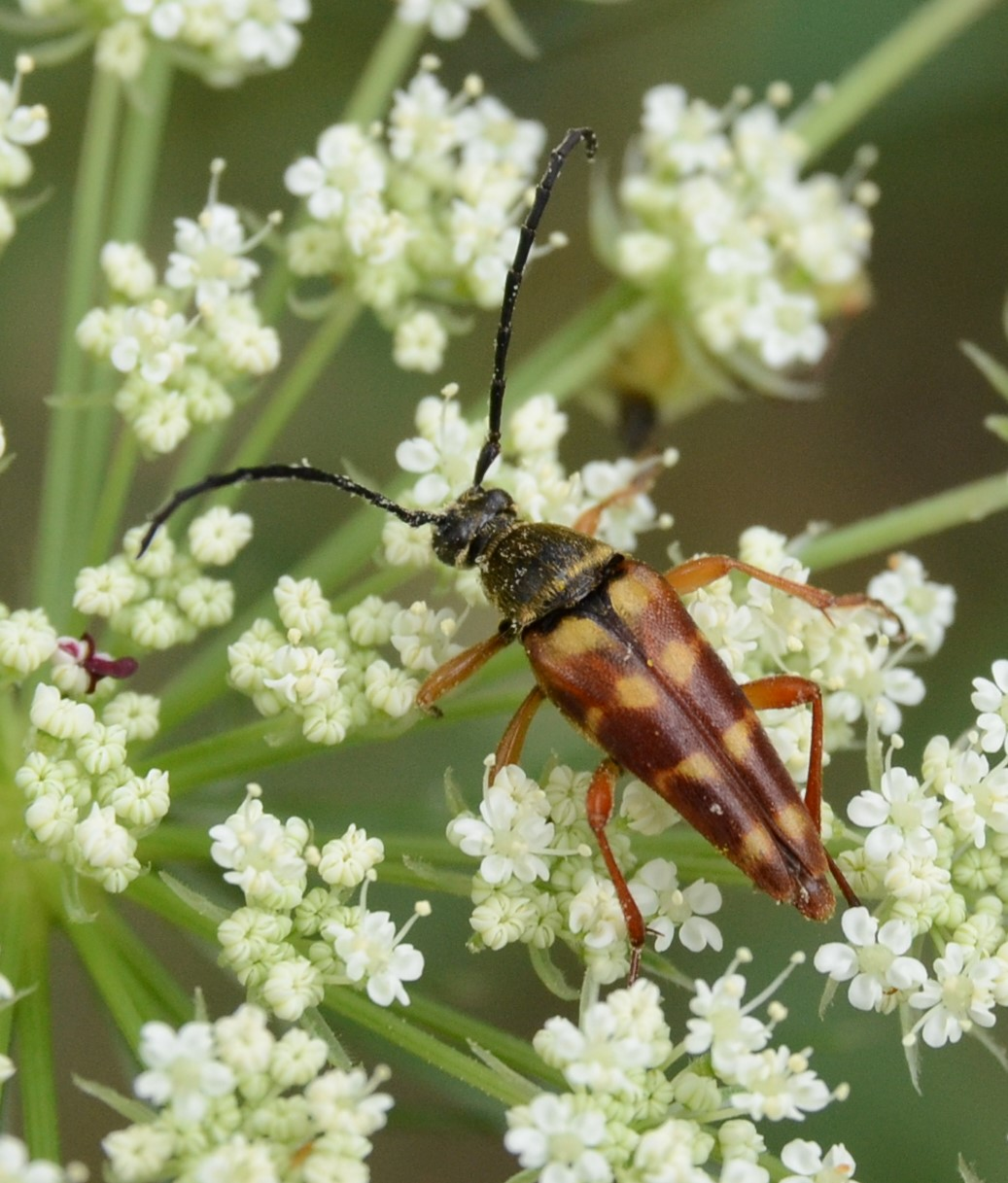
T. velutinus

Typocerus velutinus, known generally as the banded longhorn or cerambycid beetle, is a species of flower longhorn in the family of beetles known as Cerambycidae. It is found in North America. T. velutinus larvae develop within the decaying wood of trees. Commonly cited examples include birch and sumac.

== Subspecies ==
These two subspecies belong to the species Typocerus velutinus:

- Typocerus velutinus nobilis (Newman, 1841)^{i c g b}
- Typocerus velutinus velutinus (Olivier, 1795)^{i}

Data sources: i = ITIS, c = Catalogue of Life, g = GBIF, b = Bugguide.net
