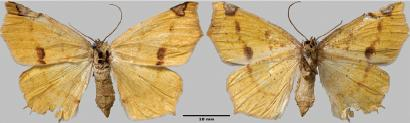

Scientific classification
- Kingdom: Animalia
- Phylum: Arthropoda
- Class: Insecta
- Order: Lepidoptera
- Family: Geometridae
- Genus: Antepione
- Species: A. thisoaria

Binomial name
- Antepione thisoaria (Guenée, 1857)

Synonyms
- Heterolocha thisoaria Guenée 1857; Sabulodes thisoaria Forbes, 1948; Hyperythra arcasaria Walker, 1860; Tetracis azonax Druce, 1892; Mimogonodes constricta Warren, 1895; Tetracis rivulata Warren, 1897; Epione depontanata Grote, 1864; Antepione sulphurata Packard, 1876; Heterolocha sulphuraria (Packard, 1873); Eutrapela furciferata Packard, 1876; Gonopteryx rhomboidaria Oberthür, 1912

= Antepione thisoaria =

Species of moth

Antepione thisoaria, the variable antepione, is a moth of the family Geometridae. In Canada it is found from Nova Scotia to Manitoba, south into the United States south and west to the Gulf states (including Alabama, Arkansas, Connecticut, Georgia, Illinois, Indiana, Iowa, Kansas, Kentucky, Louisiana, Maryland, Massachusetts, Michigan, Minnesota, Mississippi, Missouri, Nebraska, New Jersey, New Hampshire, New York, North Carolina, Ohio, Oklahoma, Pennsylvania, Rhode Island, South Carolina, Tennessee, Virginia, West Virginia), as well as Michoacan in Mexico and further south to Costa Rica and Guatemala.

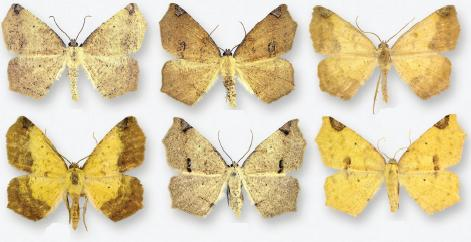
Variety in adults

The wingspan is 27–40 mm. Adult seasonally and sexually dimorphic, but the middle of the outer margin of the hindwing and forewing are conspicuously pointed in all forms, and there is usually a dark triangular patch along the costa near the apex of the forewing (although this may be absent in females). The spring brood of both sexes has mottled light brown wings (form "furciferata"). The summer brood male is bright yellow with reddish-brown shading, while the female is all yellow. Adults are on wing from April to May with an occasional mid March and mid June record as well as from July to August with occasional September to mid October records. There is one generation in Canada, and at least two southward.

The larvae have been recorded on Aceraceae, Anacardiaceae, Betulaceae, Ebenaceae and Rosaceae species, including Alnus rugosa, Physocarpus opulifolius and Prunus serotina.
