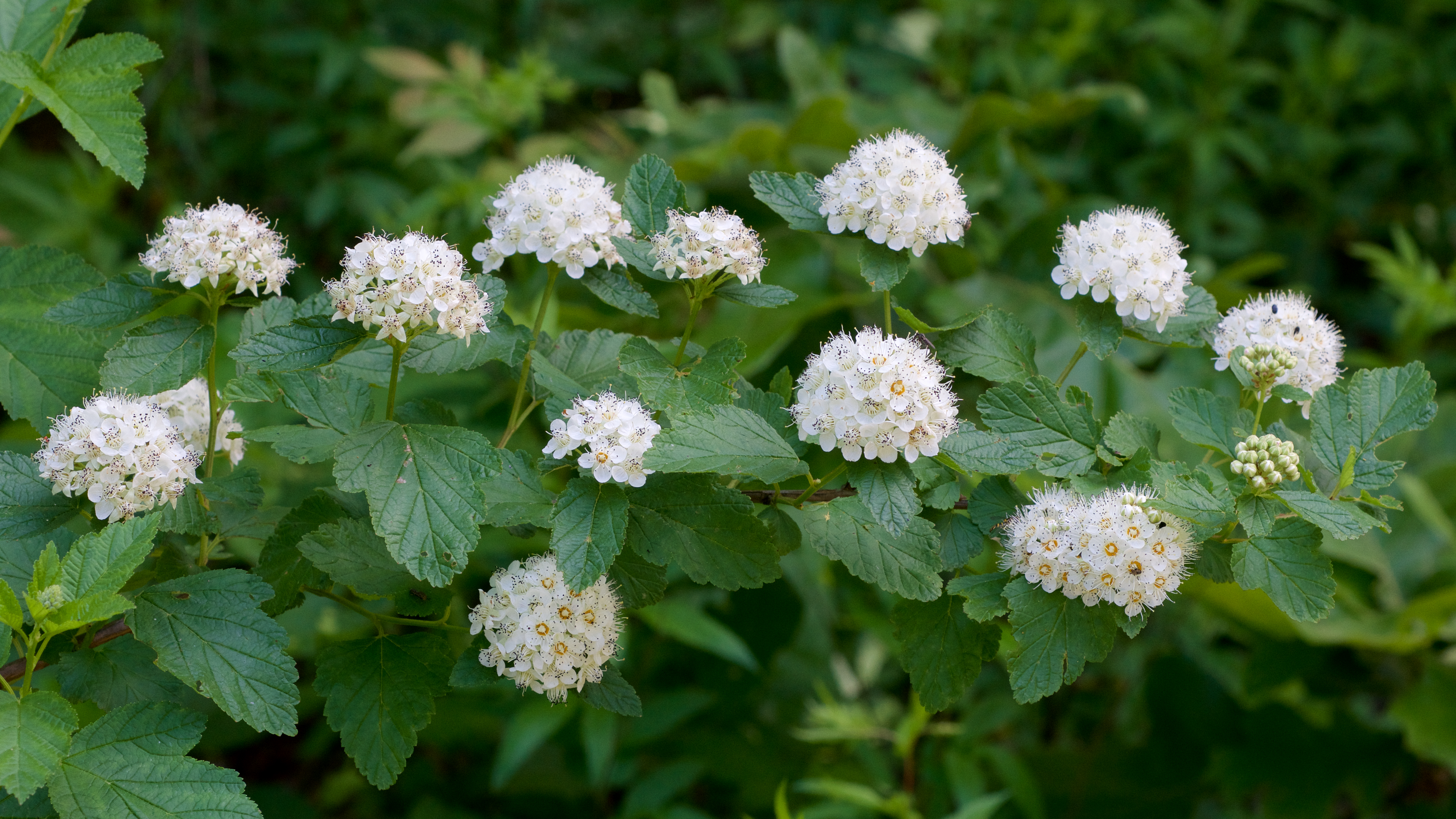
- Inflorescences

Conservation status
- Secure (NatureServe)

Scientific classification
- Kingdom: Plantae
- Clade: Tracheophytes
- Clade: Angiosperms
- Clade: Eudicots
- Clade: Rosids
- Order: Rosales
- Family: Rosaceae
- Genus: Physocarpus
- Species: P. opulifolius

Binomial name
- Physocarpus opulifolius (L.) Maxim. 1879

= Physocarpus opulifolius =

Species of shrub

Physocarpus opulifolius, known as common ninebark, Eastern ninebark, Atlantic ninebark, or simply ninebark, is a species of flowering plant in the rose family Rosaceae, native to eastern North America, named for its peeling multi-hued bark.

== Description ==
It is a mound-shaped deciduous shrub with alternate, simple leaves, on arching stems. It has a height from 1–3 m (3–10 ft) and a spread of 1–2 m (4–6 ft). The leaves vary from 3–12 cm (1–5 in) in length, with palmately veined lobes. It is fast-growing, insect- and disease-resistant, and drought-tolerant. The species is adaptable to a very wide range of soil and site conditions, from moist to dry, acid to alkaline, and gravelly to heavy clay; and can grow in partial shade to full sun. The 5-petaled, 6–8 mm (0.24–0.31 in) diameter flowers form in corymbs. The flowers are white to pinkish, blooming from May to June in North America. In Missouri the fruits ripen from August to early October and are small, dry pods hanging in drooping, papery clusters. The bark peels off in thin papery strips, exposing brown inner bark. One explanation of the common name 'ninebark' is that the peels resemble the number nine in shape.

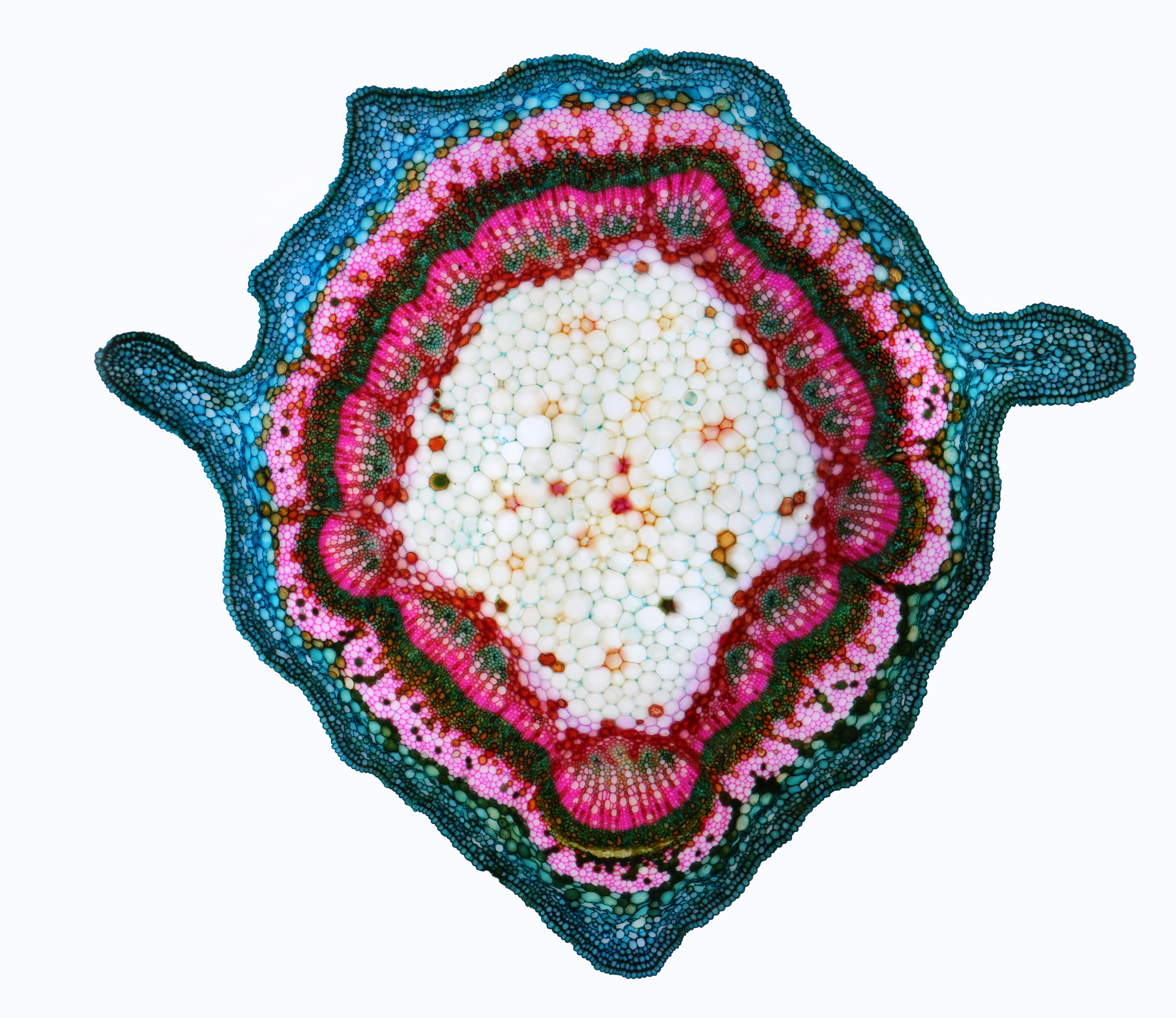
Microscopic image of a cross-section of the stalk of P. opulifolius

== Distribution and habitat ==
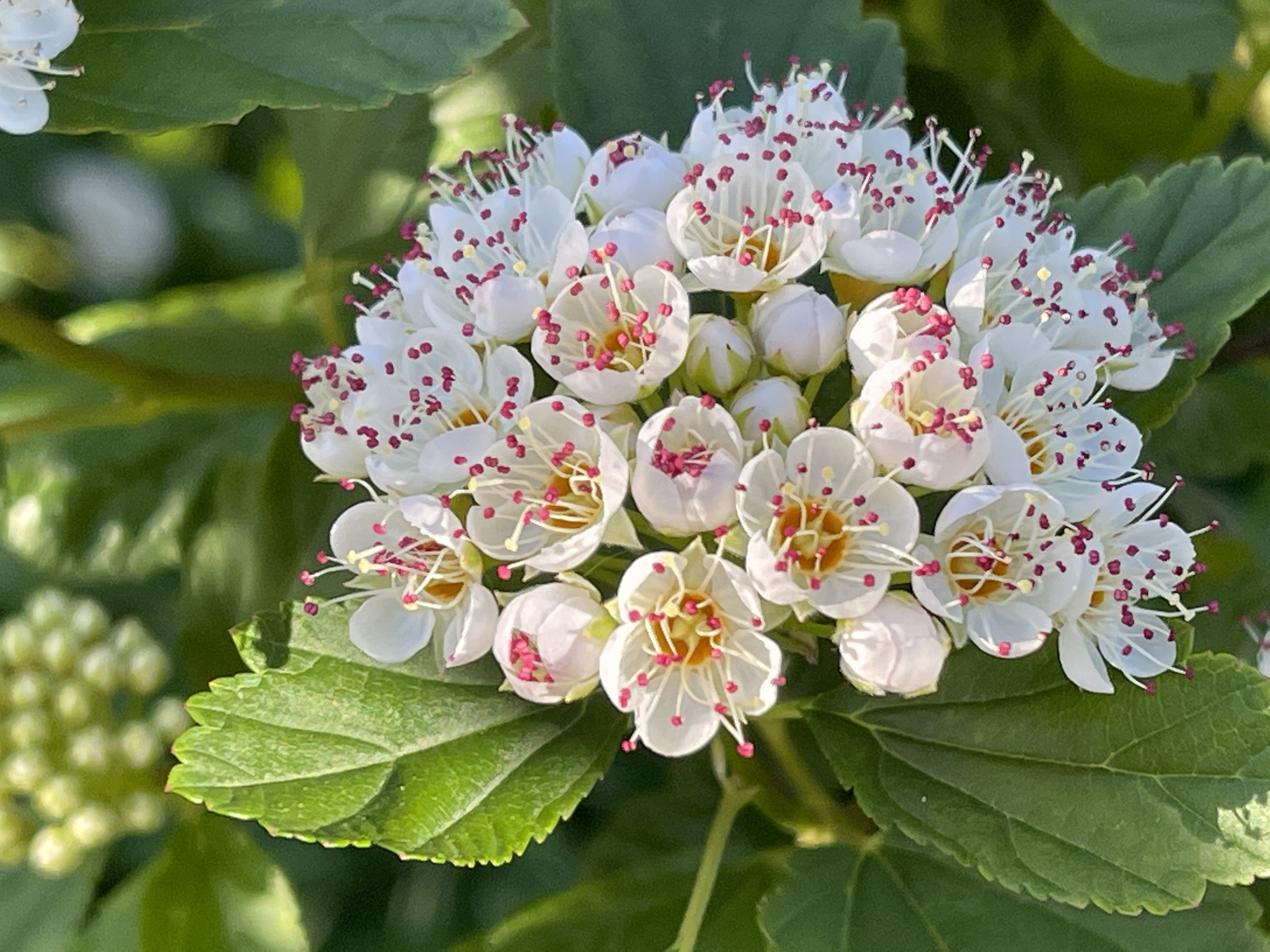
Inflorescences, Deschambault-Grondines, Quebec, Canada

Physocarpus opulifolius is found in eastern North America on rocky hillsides and banks of streams as well as in moist thickets, especially in counties south of the Missouri River. There is also a scarcely distinguishable form in the Rocky Mountain region and the Pacific Northwest. Its native range is from New York to Minnesota and South Dakota, south to Florida, Arkansas and Kansas. But it can be found from Quebec west to Minnesota, South Dakota and Colorado, south to Oklahoma to Georgia and north to New York. The shrub is an escape, or a wild plant formerly cultivated, northeastward.

== Uses ==
The ability of P. opulifolius to grow in harsh conditions makes it especially suitable for erosion control on banks. But it is also grown for its ornamental foliage. Numerous cultivars have been developed, of which 'Dart's Gold', 'Diabolo', and 'Tuilad' have gained the Royal Horticultural Society's Award of Garden Merit. Newer cultivars offer different foliage color as well as smaller overall plant size.

== Ecology ==
It is a larval host for the dimorphic eulithis, for Macaria abruptata, the white spring moth, Ancylis spiraeifoliana, the blinded sphinx moth, and possibly the bluish spring moth. The larvae of the raspberry leafroller have also been recorded on this plant.
