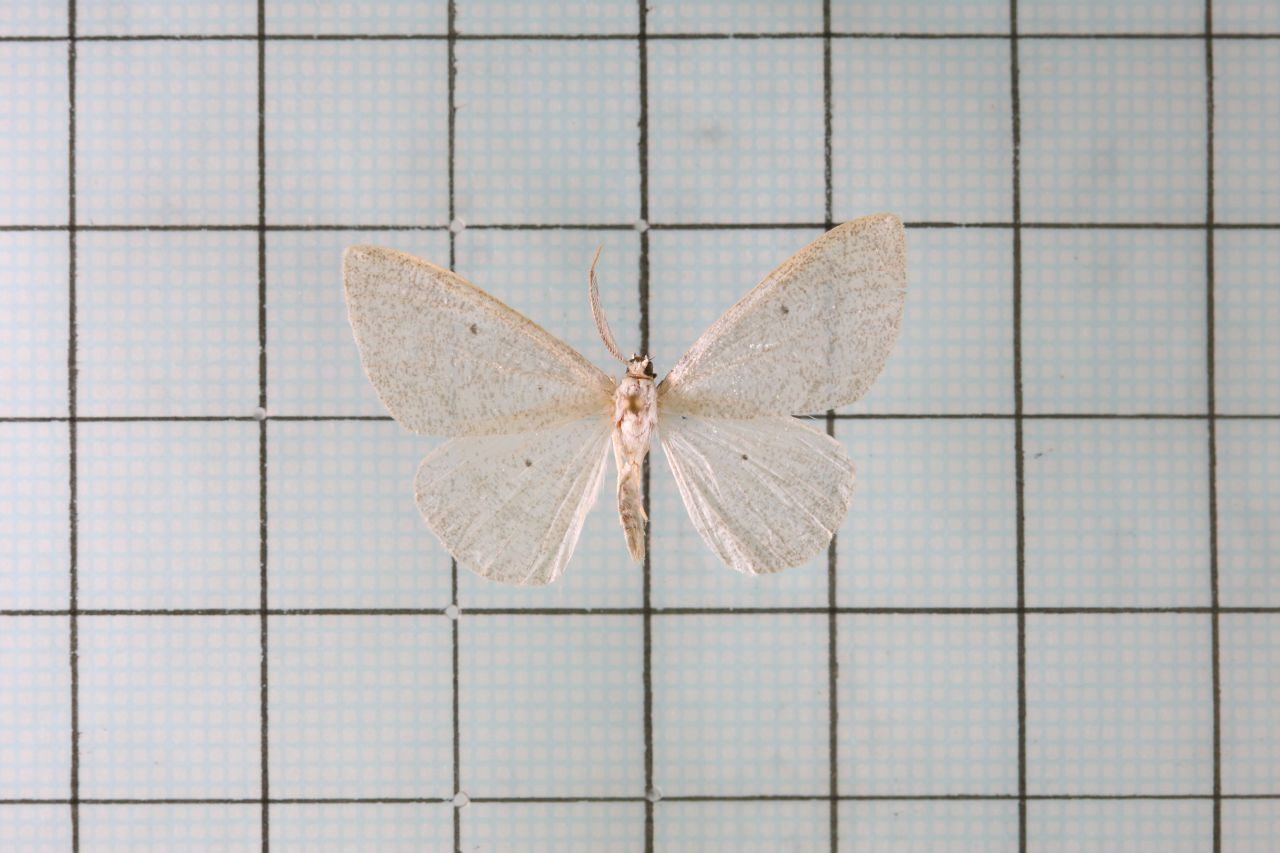

Scientific classification
- Domain: Eukaryota
- Kingdom: Animalia
- Phylum: Arthropoda
- Class: Insecta
- Order: Lepidoptera
- Family: Geometridae
- Genus: Lomographa
- Species: L. anoxys

Binomial name
- Lomographa anoxys (Wehrli, 1936)

Synonyms
- Bapta anoxys Wehrli, 1936; Lomographa laurentschwartzi Herbulot, 1992; Bapta phaedra Wehrli, 1936

= Lomographa anoxys =

Species of moth

Lomographa anoxys is a moth in the family Geometridae first described by Wehrli in 1936. It is found in China, Taiwan, India, Nepal, Thailand, Peninsular Malaysia and the Philippines.
