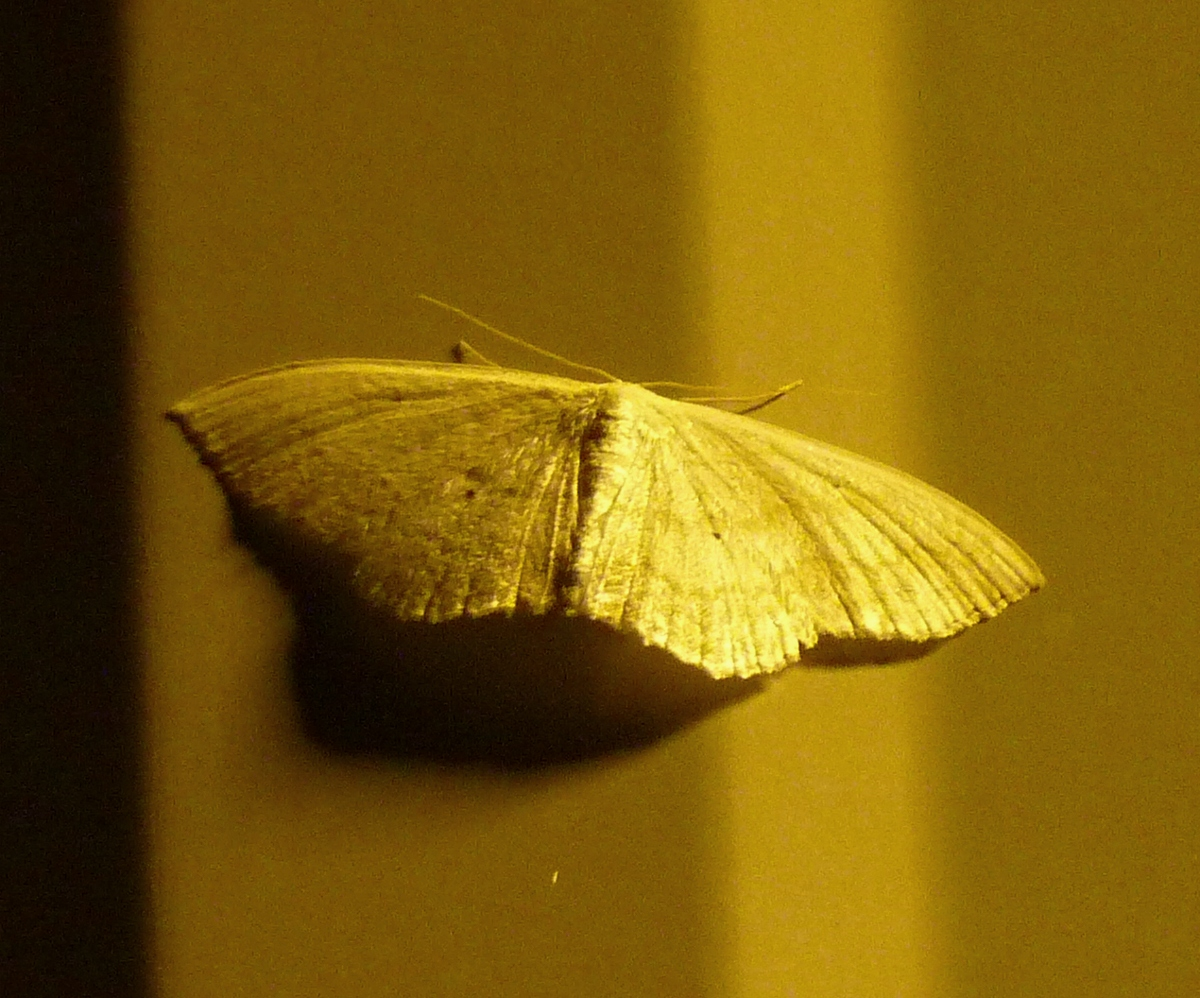

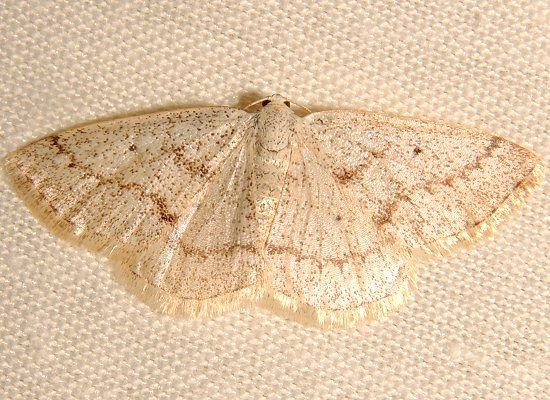

Scientific classification
- Domain: Eukaryota
- Kingdom: Animalia
- Phylum: Arthropoda
- Class: Insecta
- Order: Lepidoptera
- Family: Geometridae
- Genus: Lomographa
- Species: L. glomeraria

Binomial name
- Lomographa glomeraria (Grote, 1881)

Synonyms
- Deilinia glomeraria Grote, 1881; Lomographa merricki (Cassino & Swett, 1922); Lomographa virginalis (Cassino & Swett, 1923)

= Lomographa glomeraria =

Species of moth

Lomographa glomeraria, the gray spring moth, is a moth of the family Geometridae. The species was first described by Augustus Radcliffe Grote in 1881. It is found in eastern North America, including Alabama, Arkansas, Illinois, Indiana, Maryland, Massachusetts, Michigan, Oklahoma, Ontario, Pennsylvania and Tennessee.

The wingspan is about 25 mm.

The larvae feed on Prunus species.
