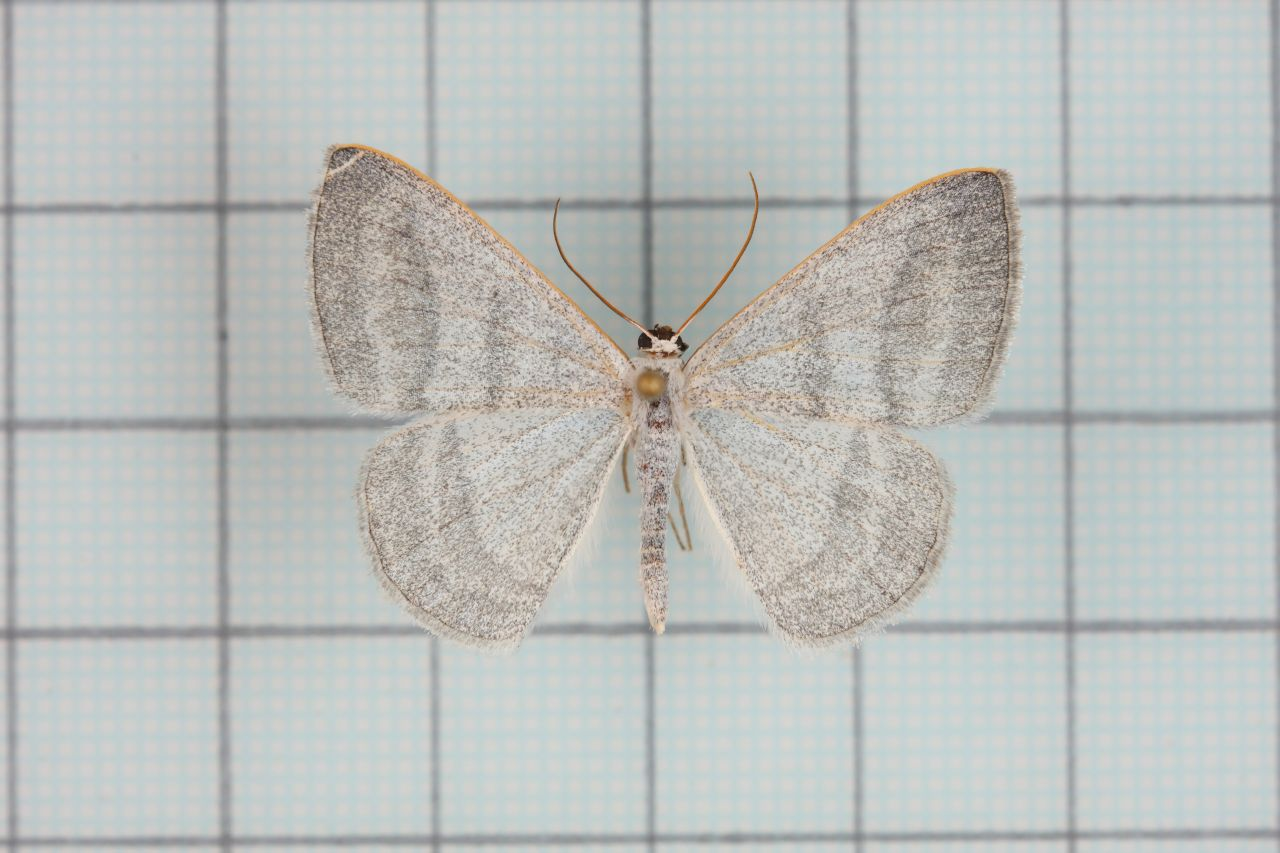
- Lomographa platyleucata marginata

Scientific classification
- Kingdom: Animalia
- Phylum: Arthropoda
- Class: Insecta
- Order: Lepidoptera
- Family: Geometridae
- Genus: Lomographa
- Species: L. platyleucata

Binomial name
- Lomographa platyleucata (Walker, 1866)

Synonyms
- Acidalia platyleucata Walker, 1866; Bapta asynapta Wehrli, 1938; Bapta marginata Wileman, 1914; Bapta poliotaeniata Wehrli, 1936

= Lomographa platyleucata =

Species of moth

Lomographa platyleucata is a moth in the family Geometridae first described by Francis Walker in 1866. It is found in China, Bhutan, India, Nepal and Taiwan.

The wingspan is about 42 mm.

== Subspecies ==
- Lomographa platyleucata platyleucata (India, Nepal)
- Lomographa platyleucata asynapta (Wehrli, 1938) (China: Shaanxi)
- Lomographa platyleucata marginata (Wileman, 1914) (Taiwan, China: Sichuan, Fujien)
