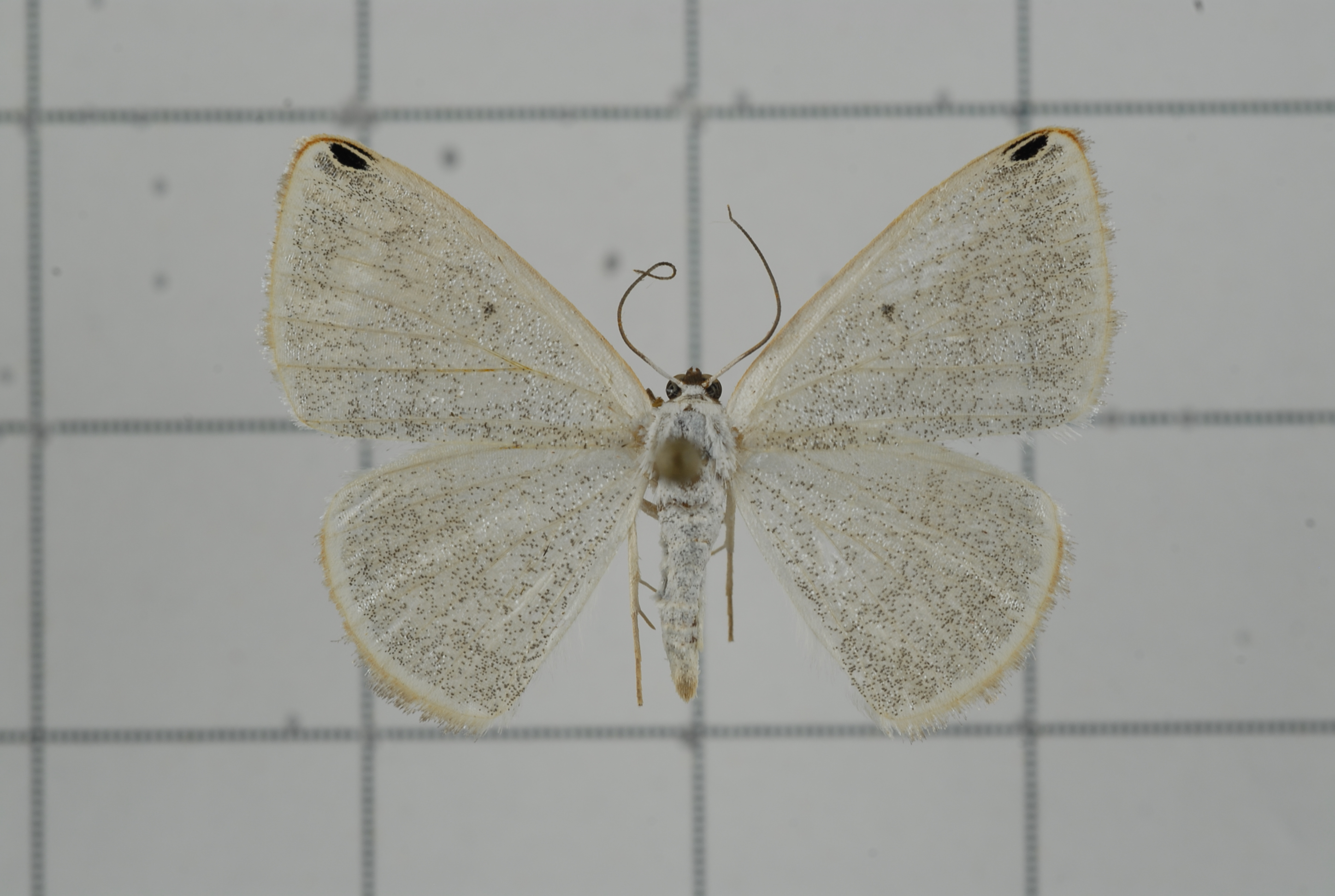

Scientific classification
- Domain: Eukaryota
- Kingdom: Animalia
- Phylum: Arthropoda
- Class: Insecta
- Order: Lepidoptera
- Family: Geometridae
- Genus: Lomographa
- Species: L. perapicata

Binomial name
- Lomographa perapicata (Wehrli, 1924)

Synonyms
- Bapta perapicata Wehrli, 1924

= Lomographa perapicata =

Species of moth

Lomographa perapicata is a moth in the family Geometridae. It is found in Taiwan and China.
