= Lomographa rara =

Scientific classification
- Domain: Eukaryota
- Kingdom: Animalia
- Phylum: Arthropoda
- Class: Insecta
- Order: Lepidoptera
- Family: Geometridae
- Genus: Lomographa
- Species: L. rara

Binomial name
- Lomographa rara Yazaki, 1994

Species of moth

Lomographa rara is a moth in the family Geometridae first described by Katsumi Yazaki in 1994. It is found in Taiwan.

The wingspan is about 28 mm. The wings are densely irrorated (sprinkled) with brownish fuscous.
