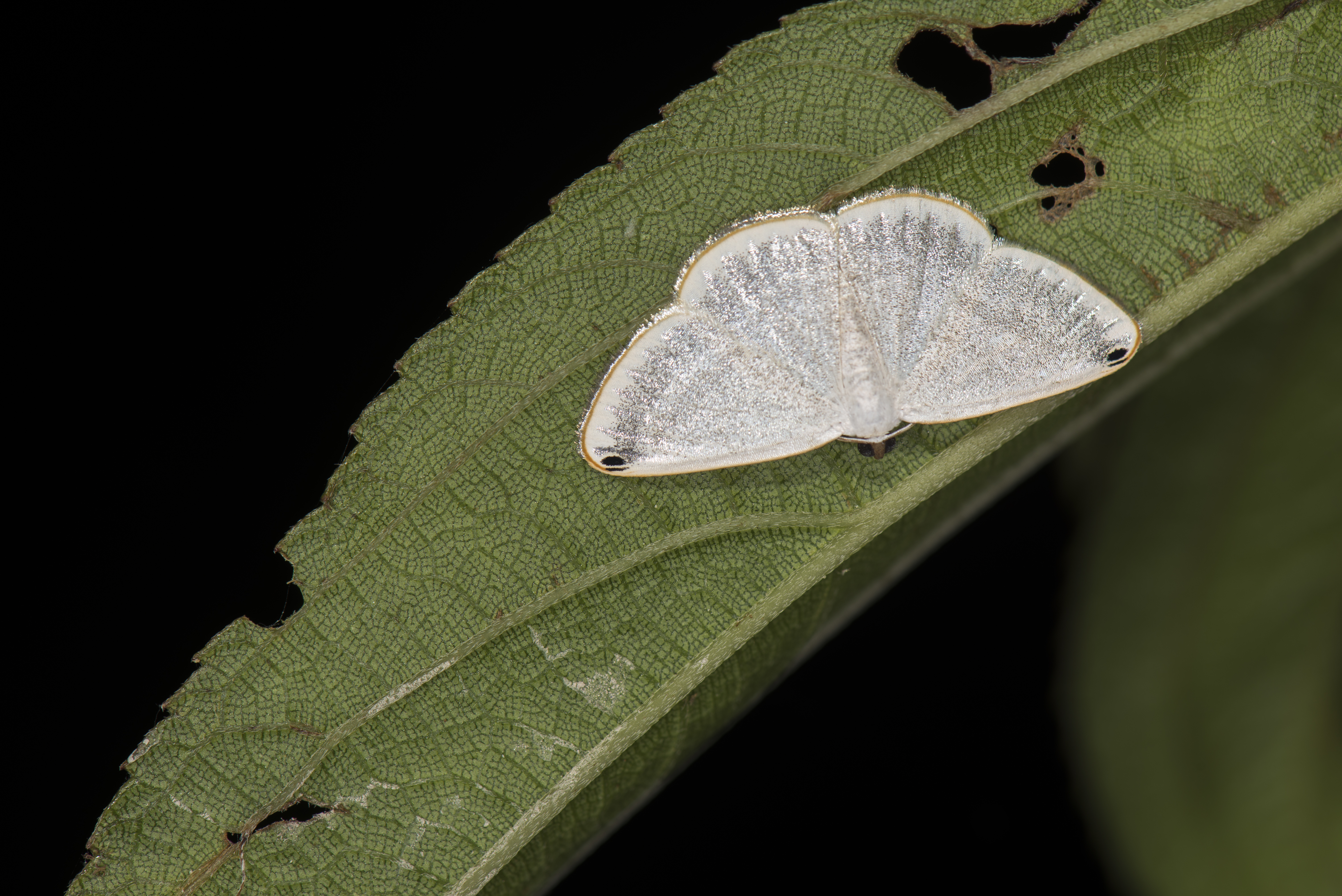

Scientific classification
- Domain: Eukaryota
- Kingdom: Animalia
- Phylum: Arthropoda
- Class: Insecta
- Order: Lepidoptera
- Family: Geometridae
- Genus: Lomographa
- Species: L. percnosticta

Binomial name
- Lomographa percnosticta Yazaki, 1994

= Lomographa percnosticta =

Species of moth

Lomographa percnosticta is a moth in the family Geometridae first described by Katsumi Yazaki in 1994. It is found in Taiwan.
