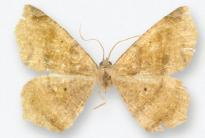

Scientific classification
- Kingdom: Animalia
- Phylum: Arthropoda
- Class: Insecta
- Order: Lepidoptera
- Family: Geometridae
- Genus: Antepione
- Species: A. tiselaaria

Binomial name
- Antepione tiselaaria (Dyar, 1912)

Synonyms
- Paragonia tiselaaria Dyar 1912

= Antepione tiselaaria =

Species of moth

Antepione tiselaaria is a moth of the family Geometridae. It is known from the Mexican states of Morelos and Puebla, and Costa Rica.

The length of the forewings is 17–18 mm.
