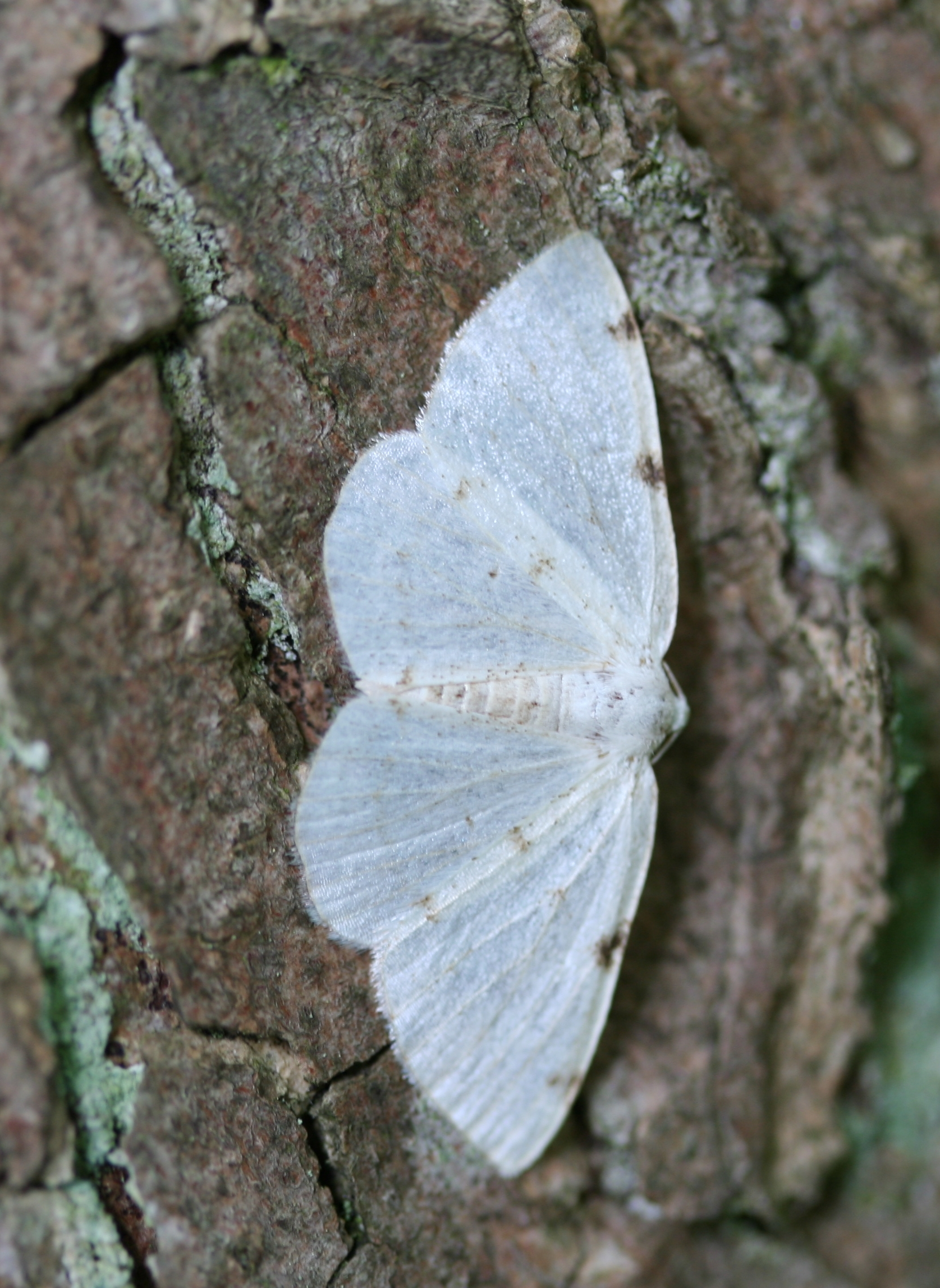
- Adult at Ĳmuiden, Netherlands

Scientific classification
- Kingdom: Animalia
- Phylum: Arthropoda
- Clade: Pancrustacea
- Class: Insecta
- Order: Lepidoptera
- Family: Geometridae
- Genus: Lomographa
- Species: L. bimaculata

Binomial name
- Lomographa bimaculata (Fabricius, 1775)

Synonyms
- See text

= Lomographa bimaculata =

Species of moth

Lomographa bimaculata, the white-pinion spotted, is a species of geometer moth (family Geometridae). It belongs to the large geometer moth subfamily Ennominae, and therein to the tribe Baptini. It is – under its junior synonym – the type species of its genus Lomographa. It is also (under its original name Phalaena bimaculata) the type species of Bapta, a junior objective synonym of Lomographa and the namesake of the Baptini. The species was first described by Johan Christian Fabricius in 1775.

Two subspecies have been named, as well as several forms (e.g. bipunctata):

- Lomographa bimaculata bimaculata (Fabricius, 1775)
- Lomographa bimaculata subnotata (Warren, 1895)

== Ecology and description ==
The rather common species inhabits mainly woodland areas and can be found all over central and eastern Europe. However, it seems to be absent in the Balkans, between Bosnia-Herzegovina and Greece. It is also not found in Iceland and is rare at the periphery of its range; for example, north of the English Midlands and on Ireland it is found only locally. To the east it extends into the Caucasus, Russia, the Russian Far East, Siberia, Central Asia and Japan. The species occurs in the Southern Alps only at lower altitudes. It prefers to live on bushy deciduous forest edges, on forest clearings, on river banks, as well as in gardens and parks.

The adults appear in the British Isles usually in early summer. But in exceptional cases it is found later in the year; it was recorded in Germany in early August 1938, for example. It is a mainly a nocturnal species which can be attracted to light. The adult's wingspan is 22–26 mm. The wings are a very pale silvery grey, with two dark grey spots on each forewing's leading edge, from which the two bands typical of Ennominae (but in this species consisting only of very small and weak grey speckles) run over the forewings and hindwings to form a semicircle. The body is also whitish. See also Prout. The rounded egg is strongly depressed. Adult caterpillars have a green colour and are recognizable by a purple brown or red dorsal line, mostly interrupted and especially at the end with diamond spots. The pupa is reddish-brown and with two tips and some short bristles on the cremaster.

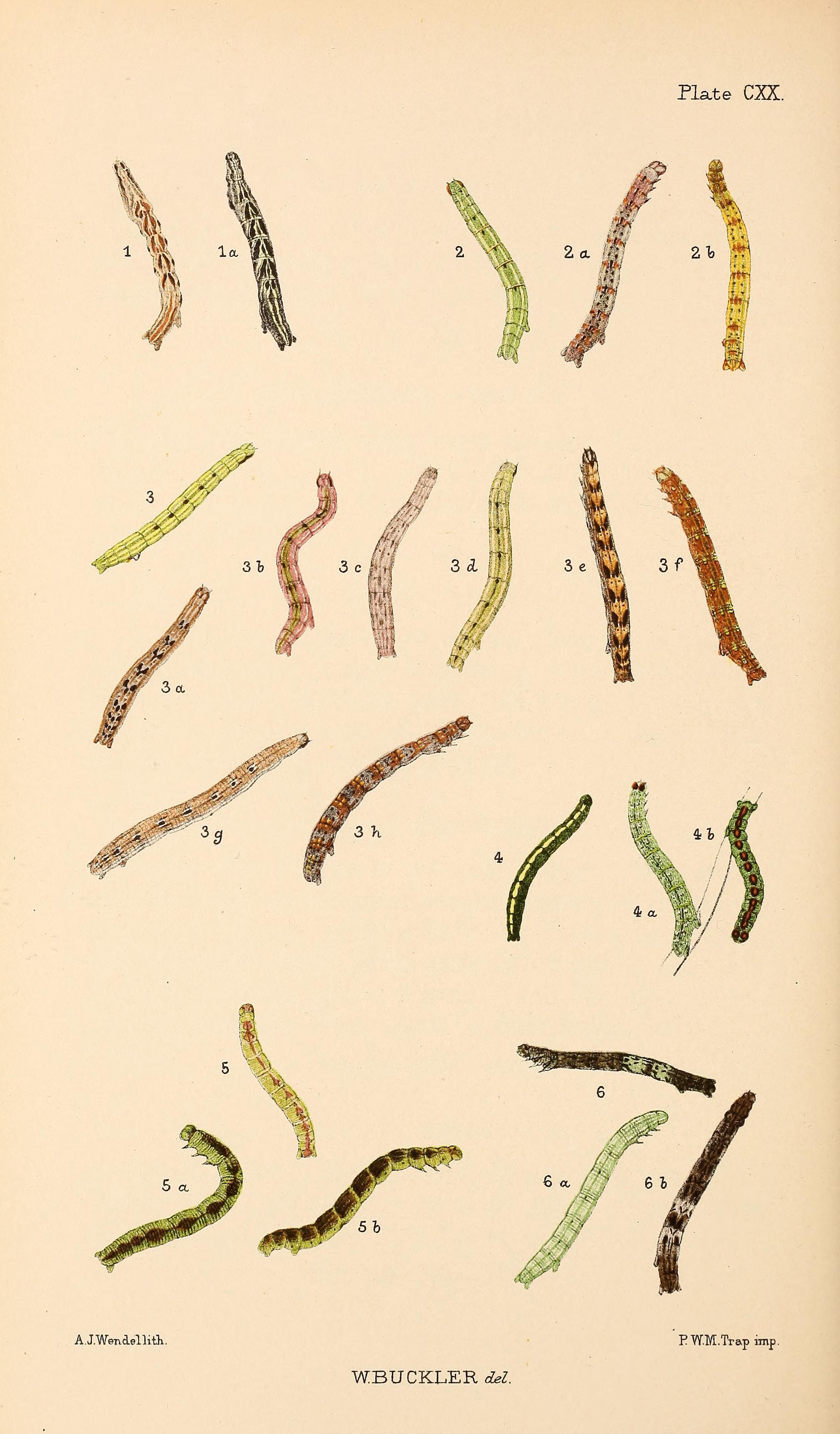
4,4a,4b larvae after final moult 5,5a, larvae in various stages

This moth has a single generation per year (though late sightings suggest that this might not always be so). The caterpillars feed on Prunus species – including bird cherry (Prunus padus) and blackthorn (Prunus spinosa) – as well as on hawthorns (Crataegus).

== Synonyms ==
Junior synonyms of the white-pinion spotted include:

- Bapta bimaculata (Fabricius, 1775)
- Geometra taminata Denis & Schiffermüller, 1775
- Lomographa taminata (Denis & Schiffermüller, 1775)
- Phalaena bimaculata Fabricius, 1775
