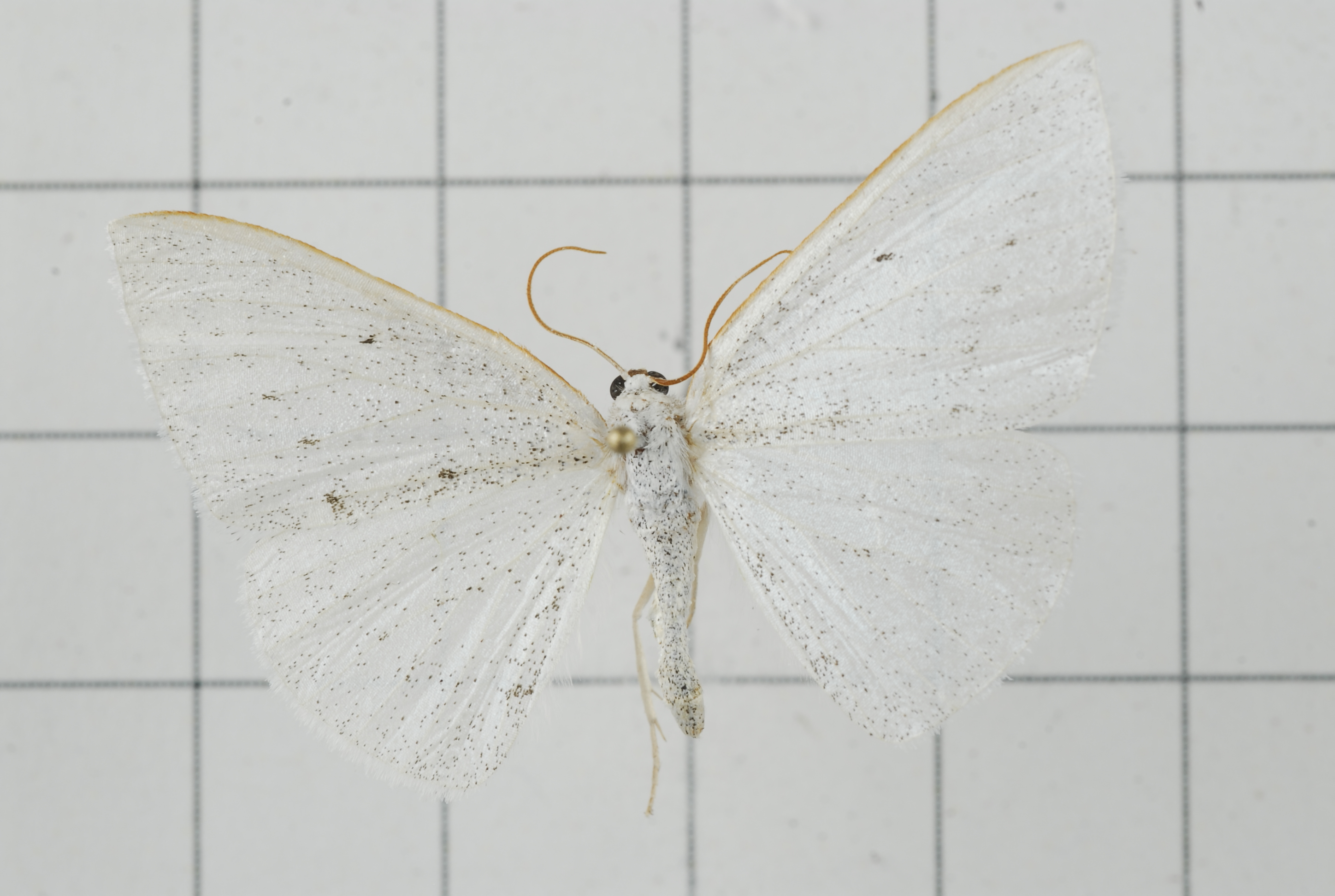

Scientific classification
- Domain: Eukaryota
- Kingdom: Animalia
- Phylum: Arthropoda
- Class: Insecta
- Order: Lepidoptera
- Family: Geometridae
- Genus: Lomographa
- Species: L. guttalata

Binomial name
- Lomographa guttalata Yazaki, 1994

= Lomographa guttalata =

Species of moth

Lomographa guttalata is a moth in the family Geometridae first described by Katsumi Yazaki in 1994. It is found in Taiwan and northern Yunnan in China.

The wingspan is 29–31 mm.
