= Lomographa elsinora =

Scientific classification
- Domain: Eukaryota
- Kingdom: Animalia
- Phylum: Arthropoda
- Class: Insecta
- Order: Lepidoptera
- Family: Geometridae
- Genus: Lomographa
- Species: L. elsinora

Binomial name
- Lomographa elsinora (Hulst, 1900)

Species of moth

Lomographa elsinora is a species of geometrid moth in the family Geometridae. It is found in North America.

The MONA or Hodges number for Lomographa elsinora is 6669.
