= Lomographa lungtanensis =

Scientific classification
- Domain: Eukaryota
- Kingdom: Animalia
- Phylum: Arthropoda
- Class: Insecta
- Order: Lepidoptera
- Family: Geometridae
- Genus: Lomographa
- Species: L. lungtanensis

Binomial name
- Lomographa lungtanensis (Wehrli, 1939)

Synonyms
- Lomographa ochrilinea lungtanensis Wehrli, 1939

Species of moth

Lomographa lungtanensis is a moth in the family Geometridae first described by Wehrli in 1939. It is found in Taiwan and China.
