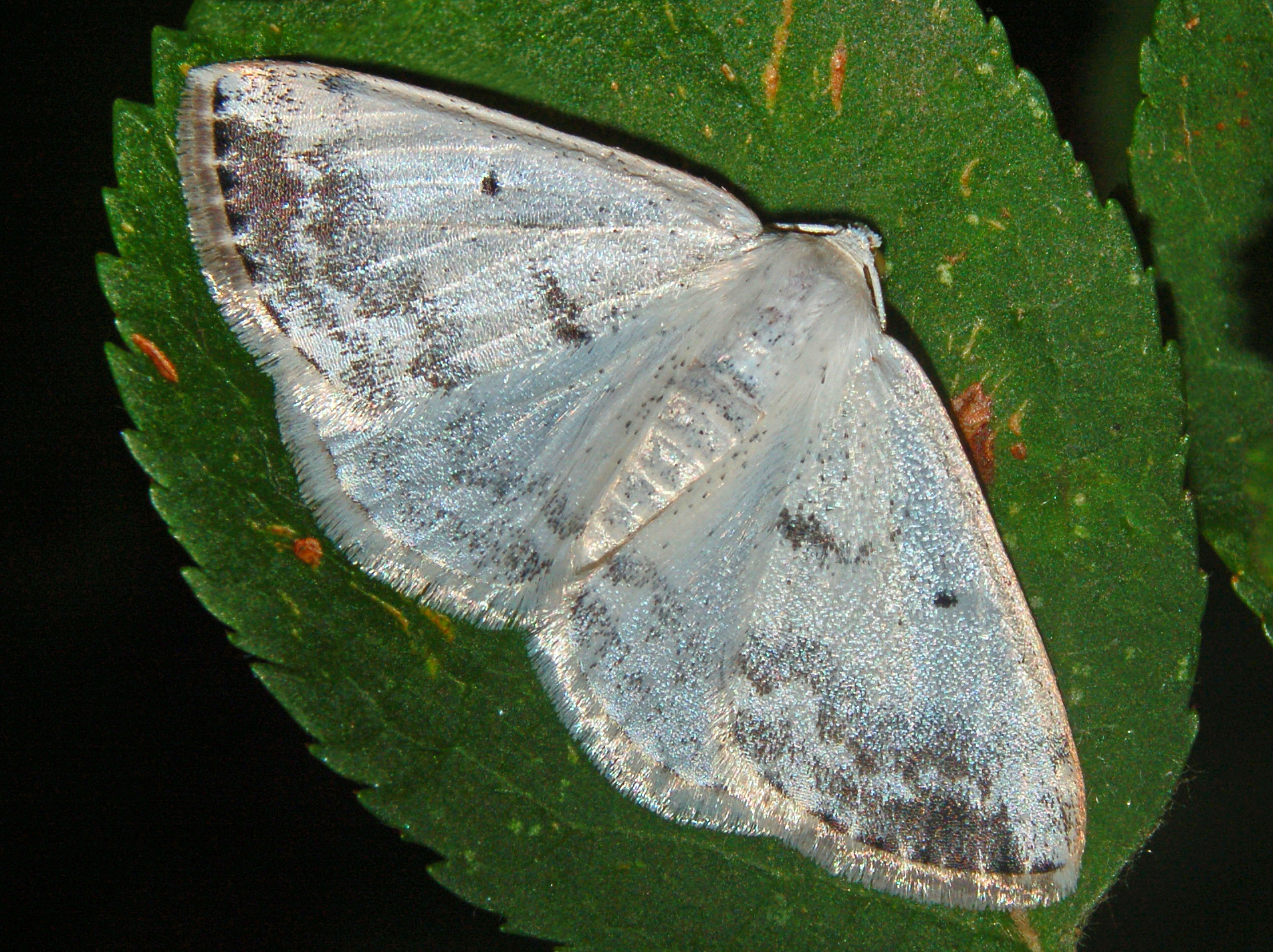
- Upperside

Scientific classification
- Kingdom: Animalia
- Phylum: Arthropoda
- Class: Insecta
- Order: Lepidoptera
- Family: Geometridae
- Genus: Lomographa
- Species: L. temerata

Binomial name
- Lomographa temerata (Denis & Schiffermüller, 1775)

= Lomographa temerata =

Species of moth

Lomographa temerata, the clouded silver, is a moth of the family Geometridae. The species is found in Asia and Europe and was first described by Michael Denis and Ignaz Schiffermüller in 1775.

== Distribution ==
The species can be found in most of Europe, the Russian Far East, Siberia, Central Asia, Transcaucasia and Issyk-Kul.

== Habitat ==
These moths inhabit woodland, suburban areas, bushy deciduous forests, mountain valleys, heathlands, hedges, meadows and gardens.

== Description ==
The wingspan is 22–26 mm. The ground colour of the wings is whitish with a silky sheen. The forewings have a black discoid spot and short black-brown markings at the base. It is also recognizable by the dark clouding in the distal part of the forewing, though this varies greatly in intensity and always leaves free (at least in part) a broad white dentate subterminal line. On the hindwings there is also a small black central spot and weakly marked grey bands. The black spots on the upperside of the wings appear also on the undersides. Grown caterpillars are green and have a yellow or reddish often interrupted line on the back. Pupae are brown.

== Biology ==
These moths fly from May to June in one generation. The larvae feed on the leaves of various trees, including hawthorn (Crataegus monogyna), blackthorn Prunus spinosa, wild cherry (Prunus avium), bird cherry (Prunus padus), Prunus cerasus, Prunus domestica, Malus domestica, Acer campestre, Fagus sylvatica, Rosa canina sp., Salix sp., Sorbus aucuparia, Impatiens noli-tangere, birch (Betula) and oak (Quercus). They overwinter as a pupa.

== Gallery ==
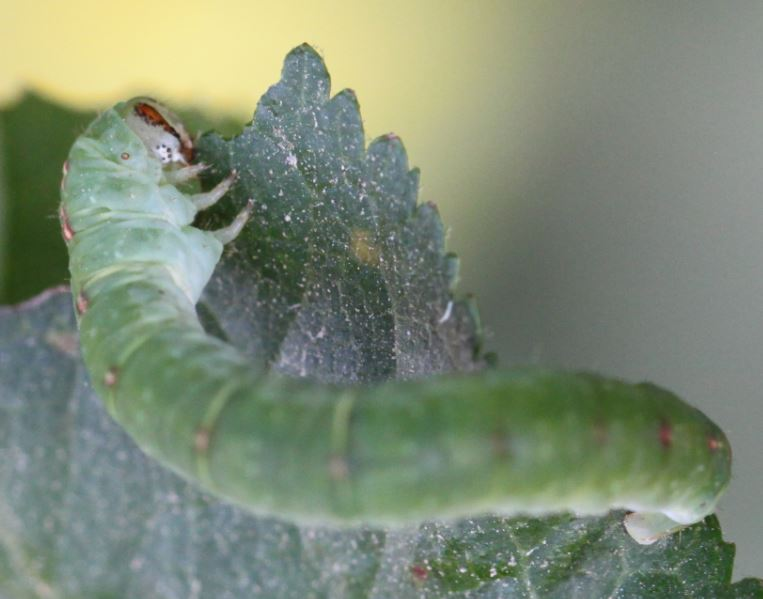
Caterpillar

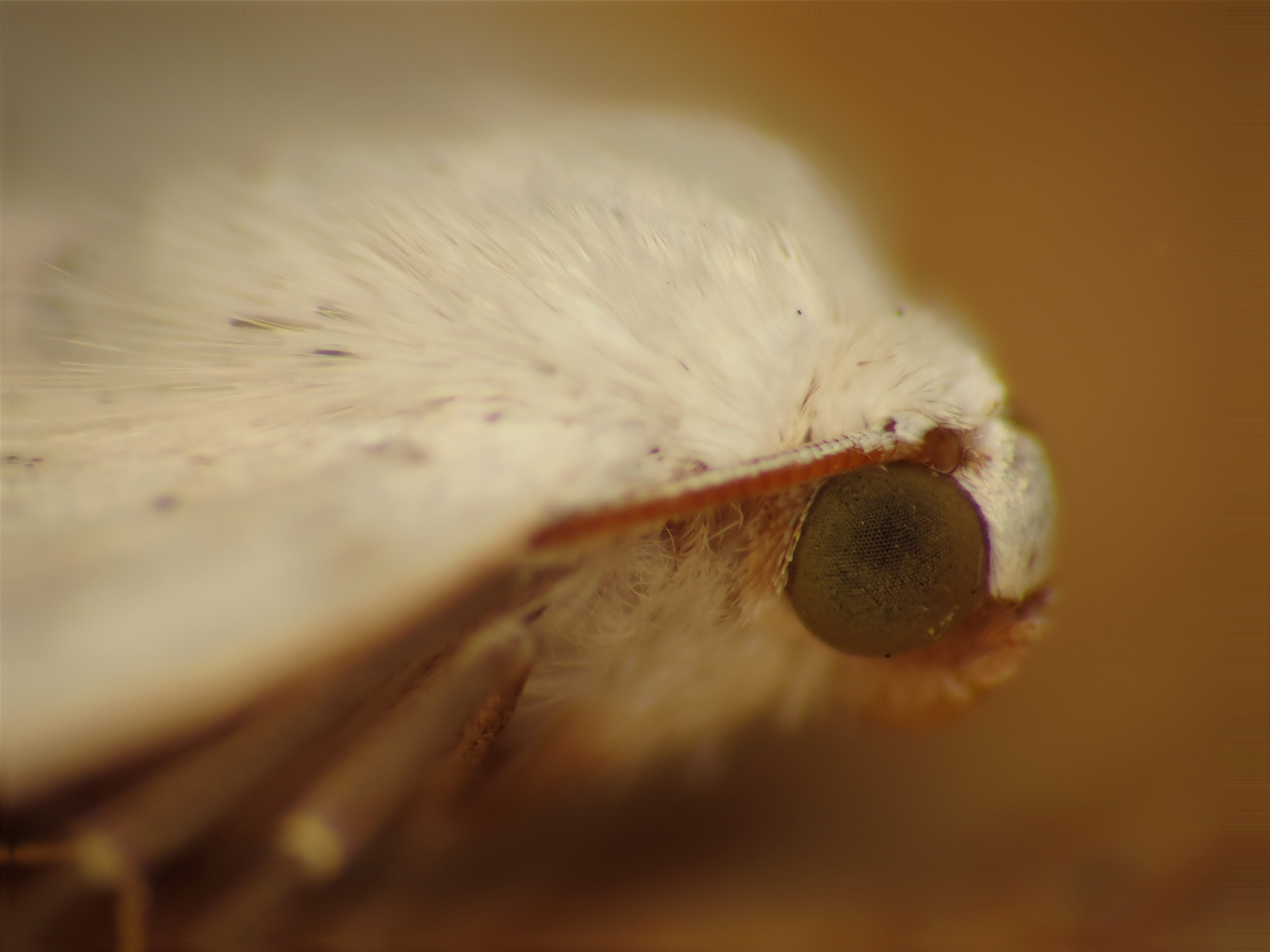
Close-up on the eye

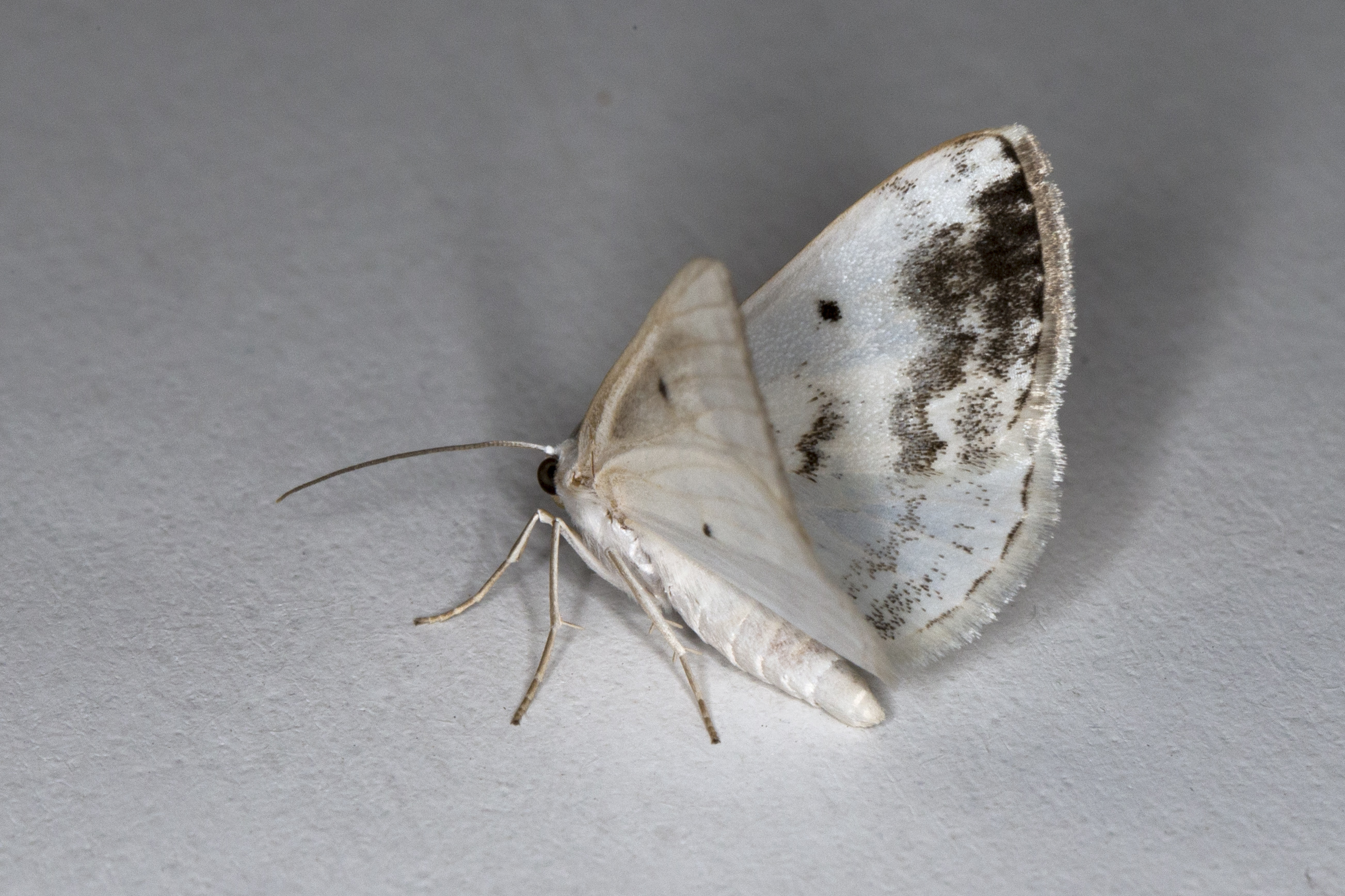
Underside

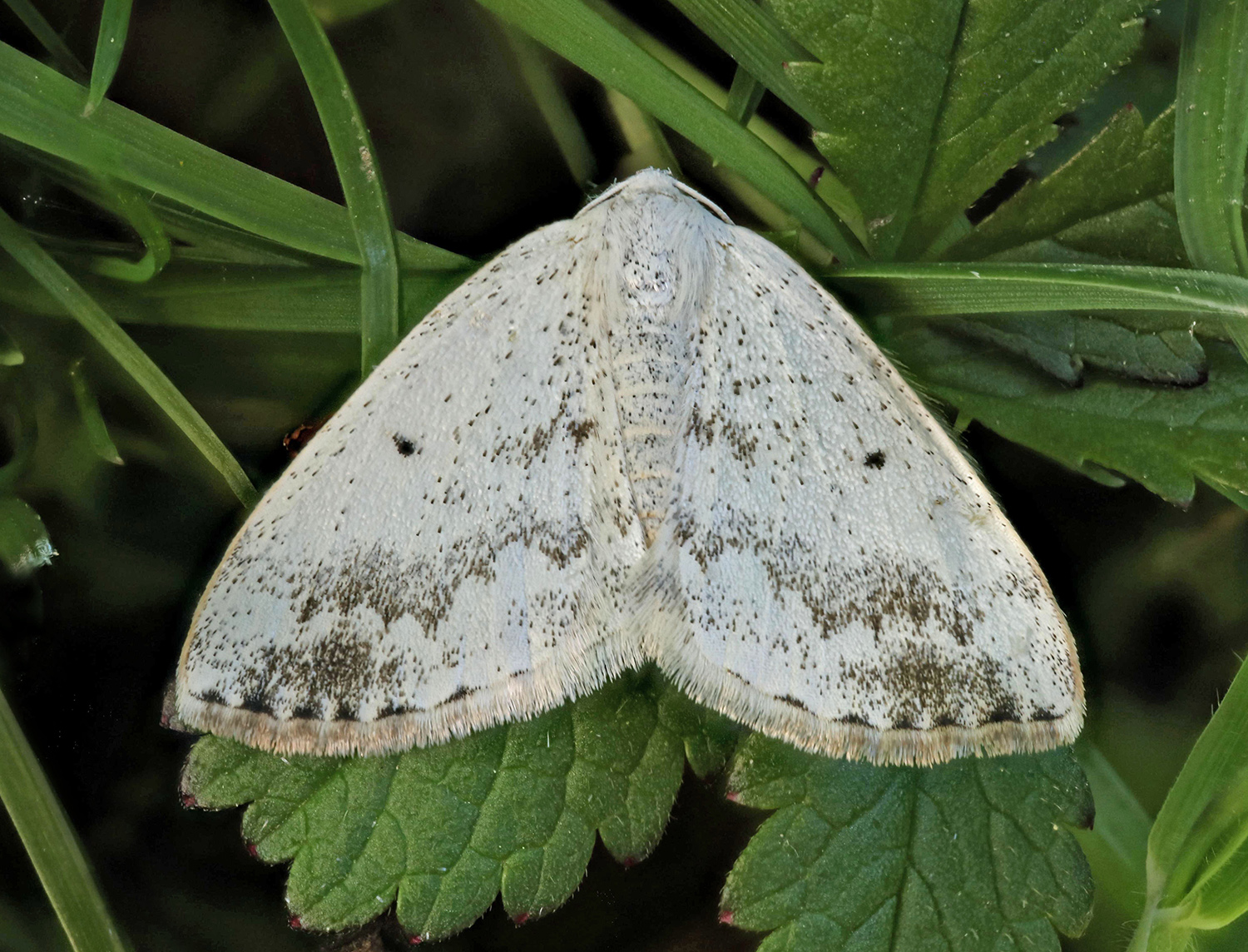
Moth

== Notes ==
1. The flight season refers to the British Isles. This may vary in other parts of the range.
