= Eulithis molliculata =

Scientific classification
- Kingdom: Animalia
- Phylum: Arthropoda
- Clade: Pancrustacea
- Class: Insecta
- Order: Lepidoptera
- Family: Geometridae
- Genus: Eulithis
- Species: E. molliculata

Binomial name
- Eulithis molliculata (Walker, 1862)

Species of moth

Eulithis molliculata, the dimorphic eulithis, is a species of geometrid moth in the family Geometridae. It is found in North America.

Its larval host is common ninebark.

The MONA or Hodges number for Eulithis molliculata is 7203.
