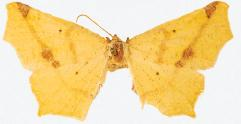
- Antepione imitata

Scientific classification
- Kingdom: Animalia
- Phylum: Arthropoda
- Clade: Pancrustacea
- Class: Insecta
- Order: Lepidoptera
- Family: Geometridae
- Tribe: Ourapterygini
- Genus: Antepione; Packard, 1876

Synonyms
- Mimogonodes Warren, 1895

= Antepione =

Genus of geometer moths

Antepione is a genus of moths in the family Geometridae, the geometer moths. The genus was described by Packard in 1876. They occur in North and Central America.

There are three species:

- Antepione imitata H. Edwards, 1884
- Antepione thisoaria (Guenée, 1857) - variable antepione
- Antepione tiselaaria (Dyar, 1912)
