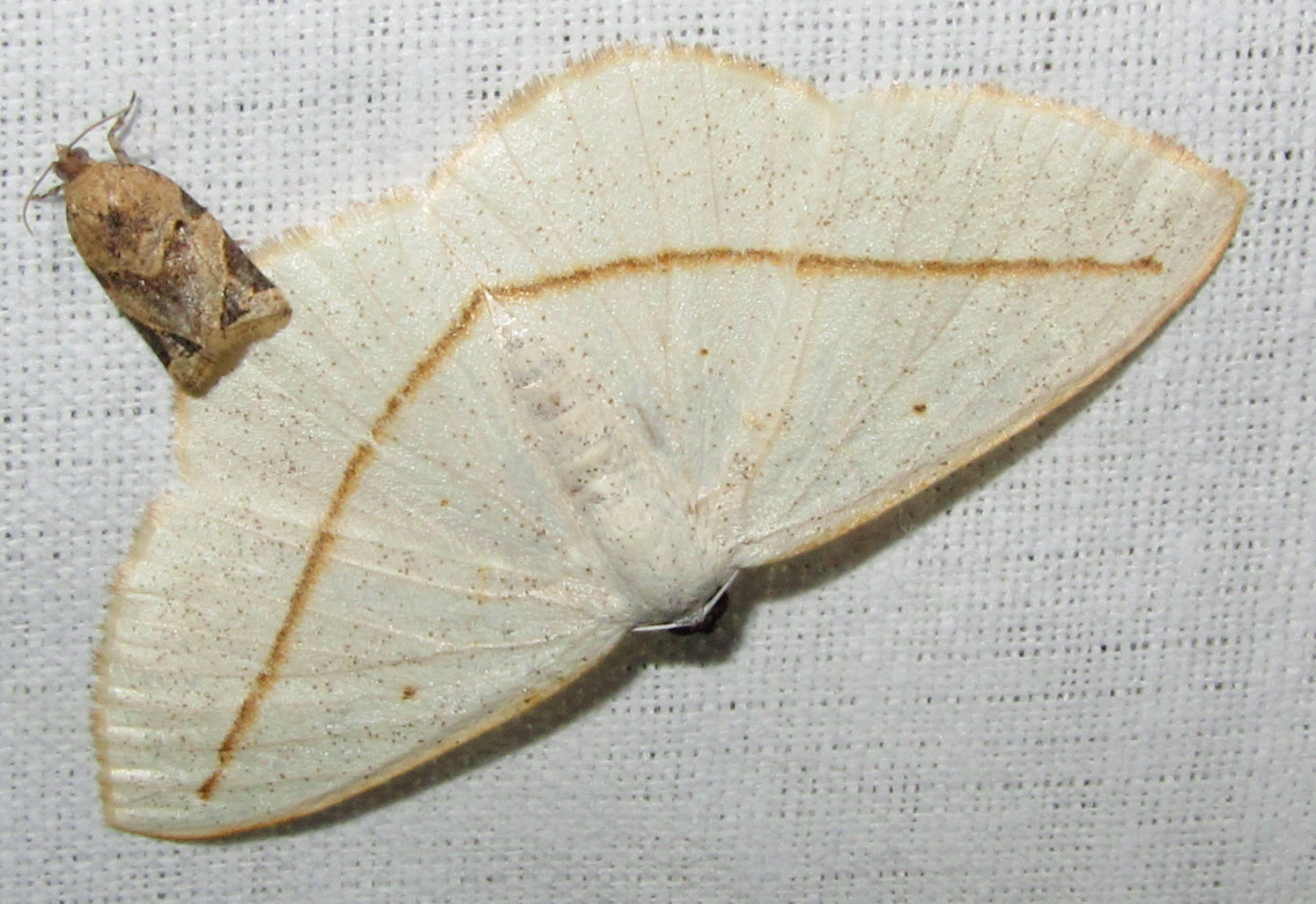

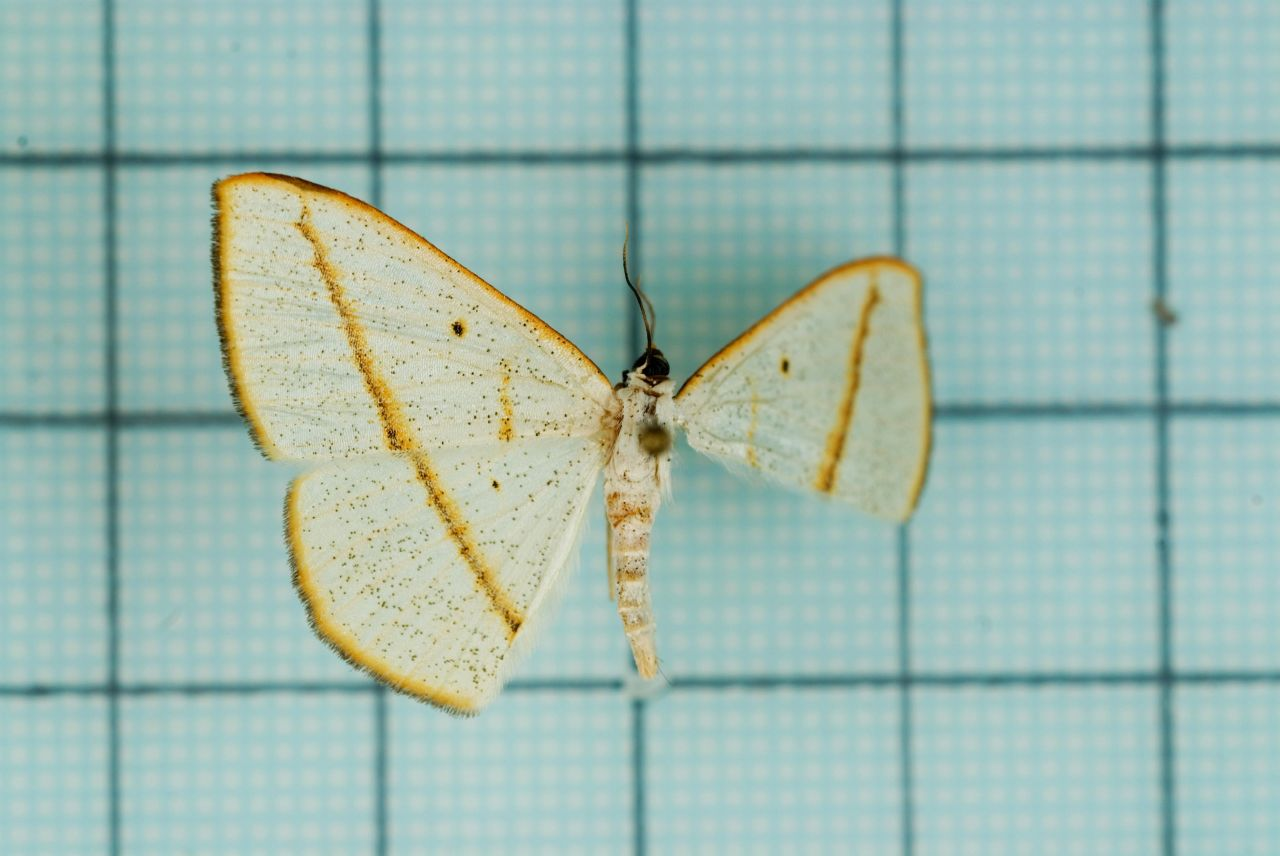

Scientific classification
- Kingdom: Animalia
- Phylum: Arthropoda
- Class: Insecta
- Order: Lepidoptera
- Family: Geometridae
- Genus: Lomographa
- Species: L. inamata

Binomial name
- Lomographa inamata (Walker, 1860)

Synonyms
- Acidalia inamata Walker, 1860; Acidalia simpliciaria Walker, 1861

= Lomographa inamata =

Species of moth

Lomographa inamata is a moth in the family Geometridae first described by Francis Walker in 1860. It is found in Sri Lanka, Japan, China, India and Taiwan.

== Description ==
The wingspan is about 26–36 mm. Forewings with vein 11 stalked with veins 7, 8, 9, and 10 anastomosing (fusing) with vein 12 and then with vein 10. Body white, irrorated (speckled) with black, whereas frons rufous. Forewings with fulvous costa and a speck at end of cell. There is an indistinct line from origin of vein 2 to inner margin. A postmedial fulvous and yellow line runs from below costa. Hindwings with speck in cell. A fulvous and yellow postmedial line present. Cilia of both wings fulvous with fuscous tips.
