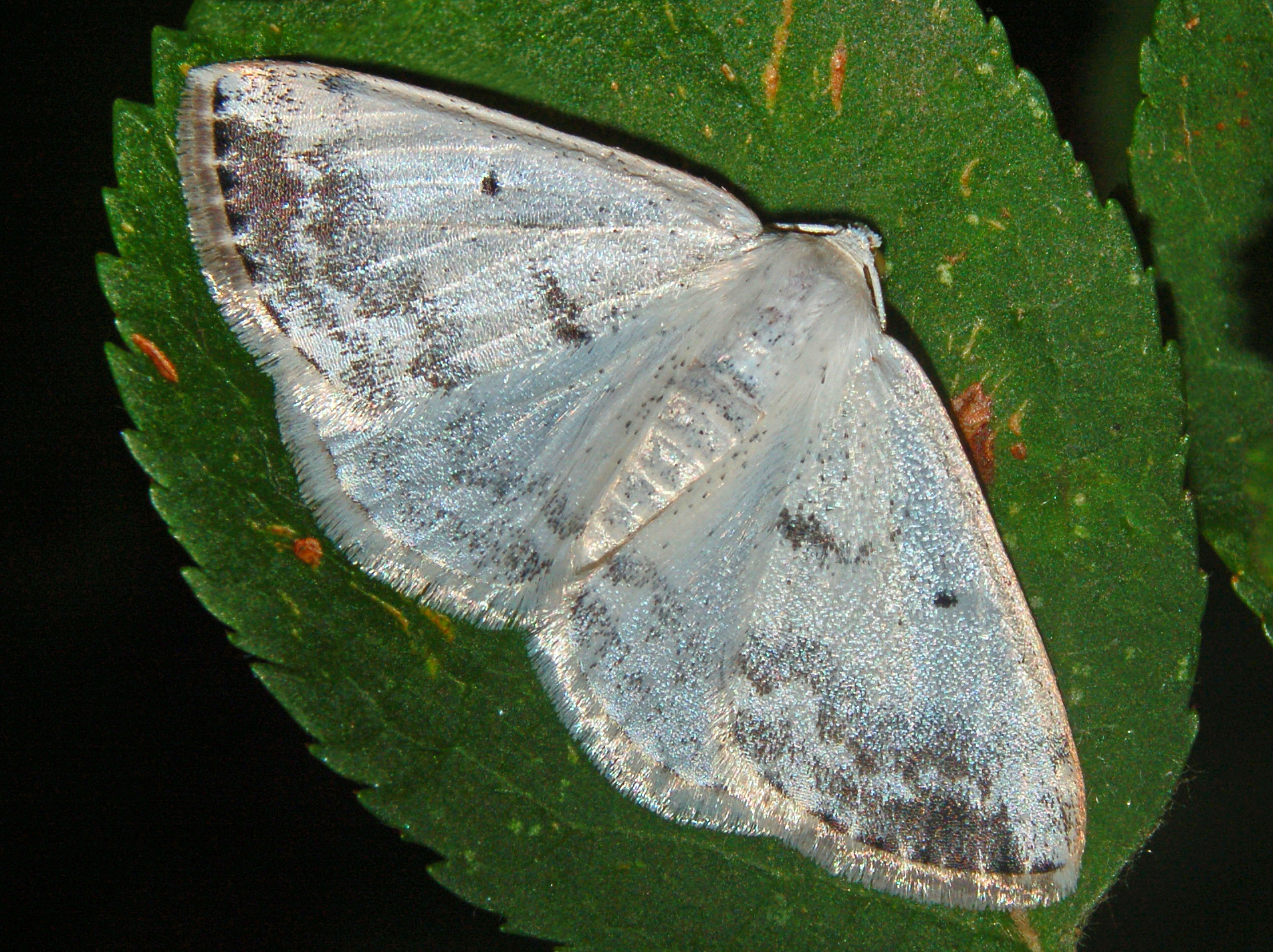
- Lomographa temerata

Scientific classification
- Kingdom: Animalia
- Phylum: Arthropoda
- Class: Insecta
- Order: Lepidoptera
- Family: Geometridae
- Tribe: Baptini
- Genus: Lomographa; Hübner, [1825]

Synonyms
- Akrobapta Werhli, 1924; Anhibernia Staudinger, 1892; Cirretaera Wehrli, 1939; Corycia Duponchel, 1829; Cyrtesia Wehrli, 1937; Earoxyptera Djakonov, 1936; Eudjakonovia D. S. Fletcher, 1979; Neobapta Djakonov, 1936

= Lomographa =

Genus of moths

Lomographa is a genus of moths in the family Geometridae. The genus was erected by Jacob Hübner in 1825.

Species include:

- Lomographa anoxys (Wehrli, 1936)
- Lomographa araeophragma (Prout, 1934)
- Lomographa bimaculata (Fabricius, 1775) – white-pinion spotted
- Lomographa buraetica (Staudinger, 1892)
- Lomographa claripennis Inoue, 1977
- Lomographa distans (Warren, 1894)
- Lomographa distinctata (Herrich-Schäffer, [1839])
- Lomographa elsinora (Hulst, 1900)
- Lomographa foedata (Warren, 1894)
- Lomographa glomeraria (Grote, 1881)
- Lomographa guttalata Yazaki, 1994
- Lomographa inamata (Walker, 1860)
- Lomographa juta (Prout, 1926)
- Lomographa luciferata (Walker, 1862)
- Lomographa lungtanensis (Wehrli, 1939)
- Lomographa margarita (Moore, [1868])
- Lomographa nivea (Djakonov, 1936)
- Lomographa notata (Warren, 1894)
- Lomographa ochrilinea (Warren, 1894)
- Lomographa orientalis (Staudinger, 1892)
- Lomographa perapicata (Wehrli, 1924)
- Lomographa percnosticta Yazaki, 1994
- Lomographa platyleucata (Wileman, 1914)
- Lomographa pulverata (A. Bang-Haas, 1910)
- Lomographa rara Yazaki, 1994
- Lomographa sectinota (Hampson, 1895)
- Lomographa semiclarata (Walker, 1866)
- Lomographa simplicior (Butler, 1881)
- Lomographa subspersata Wehrli, 1939
- Lomographa temerata (Denis & Schiffermüller, 1775) – clouded silver
- Lomographa undilinea (Warren, 1894)
- Lomographa vestaliata (Guenée, 1857)
