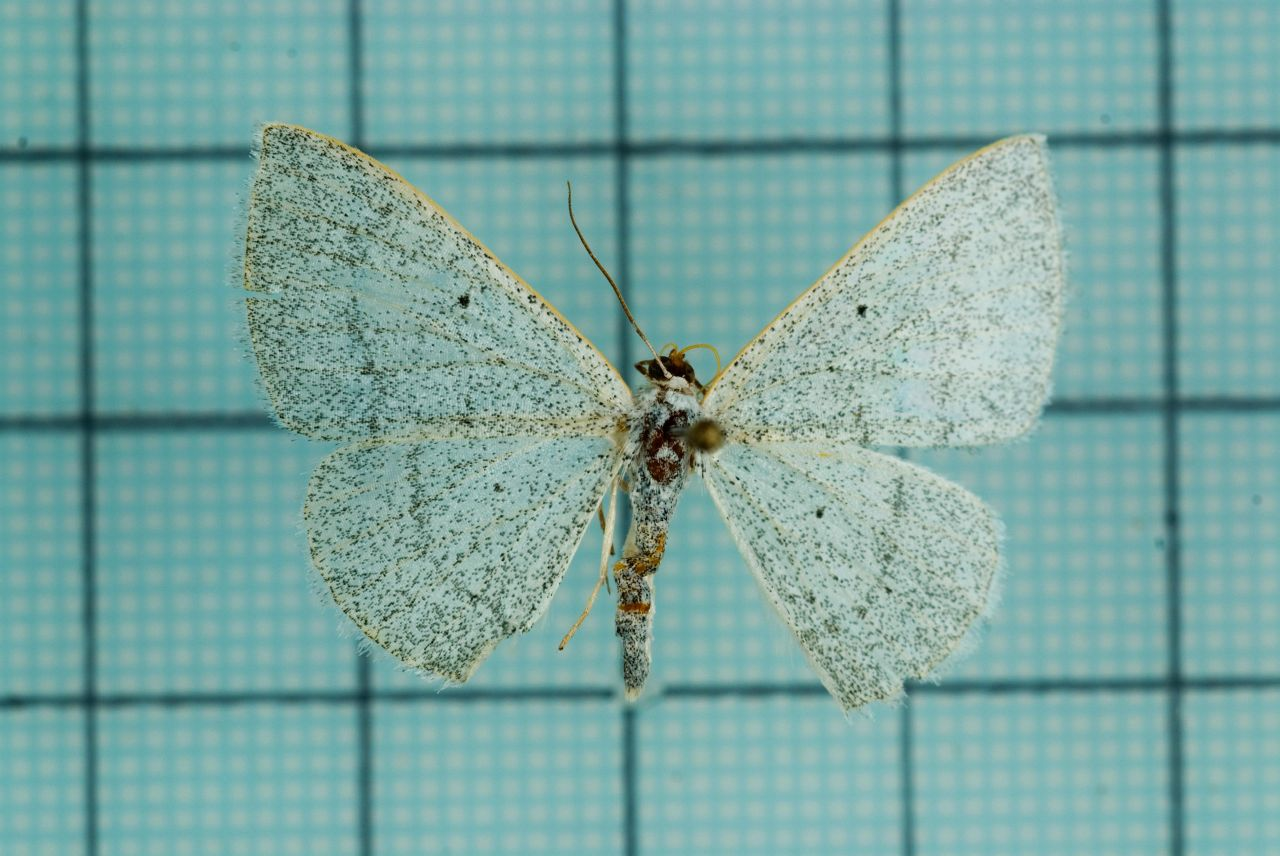

Scientific classification
- Domain: Eukaryota
- Kingdom: Animalia
- Phylum: Arthropoda
- Class: Insecta
- Order: Lepidoptera
- Family: Geometridae
- Genus: Lomographa
- Species: L. margarita

Binomial name
- Lomographa margarita (Moore, 1868)

Synonyms
- Cabera margarita Moore, 1868; Bapta conspersa Wileman, 1914

= Lomographa margarita =

Species of moth

Lomographa margarita is a moth in the family Geometridae. It is found in Taiwan and India.
