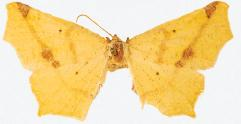

Scientific classification
- Domain: Eukaryota
- Kingdom: Animalia
- Phylum: Arthropoda
- Class: Insecta
- Order: Lepidoptera
- Family: Geometridae
- Genus: Antepione
- Species: A. imitata

Binomial name
- Antepione imitata H. Edwards, 1884

Synonyms
- Antepione comstocki Sperry, 1939; Eugonobapta constans Hulst 1898; Antepione constans (Hulst, 1898); Antepione costinotata Taylor, 1906; Tetracis indiscretata Edwards 1884; Antepione indiscretata (H. Edwards, 1884); Metanema vanusaria Strecker 1899

= Antepione imitata =

Species of moth

Antepione imitata is a moth of the family Geometridae first described by Henry Edwards in 1884. It is known from western Texas, Colorado and New Mexico to southern Arizona and is probably also found in northern Mexico. It is generally associated with riparian canyons up to 1,830 meters.

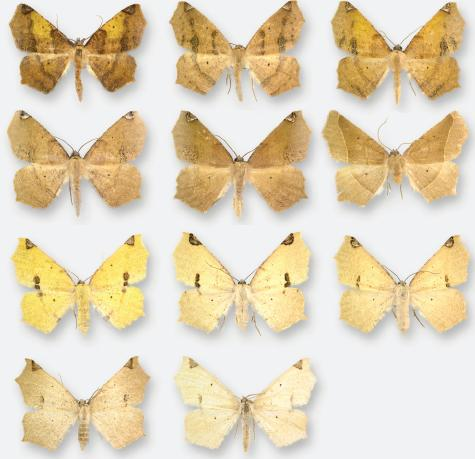
Variation in adults, upper two rows are males, bottom two are females

The wingspan is 35–37 mm. There are three generations per year in south-eastern Arizona and south-western New Mexico. There is a strong early flight starting in April and early May, with a weaker flight in late June into July, and another strong flight beginning in mid-August after the monsoonal rains with a few individuals into early October.

The larvae have been recorded on Ribes aureum.
