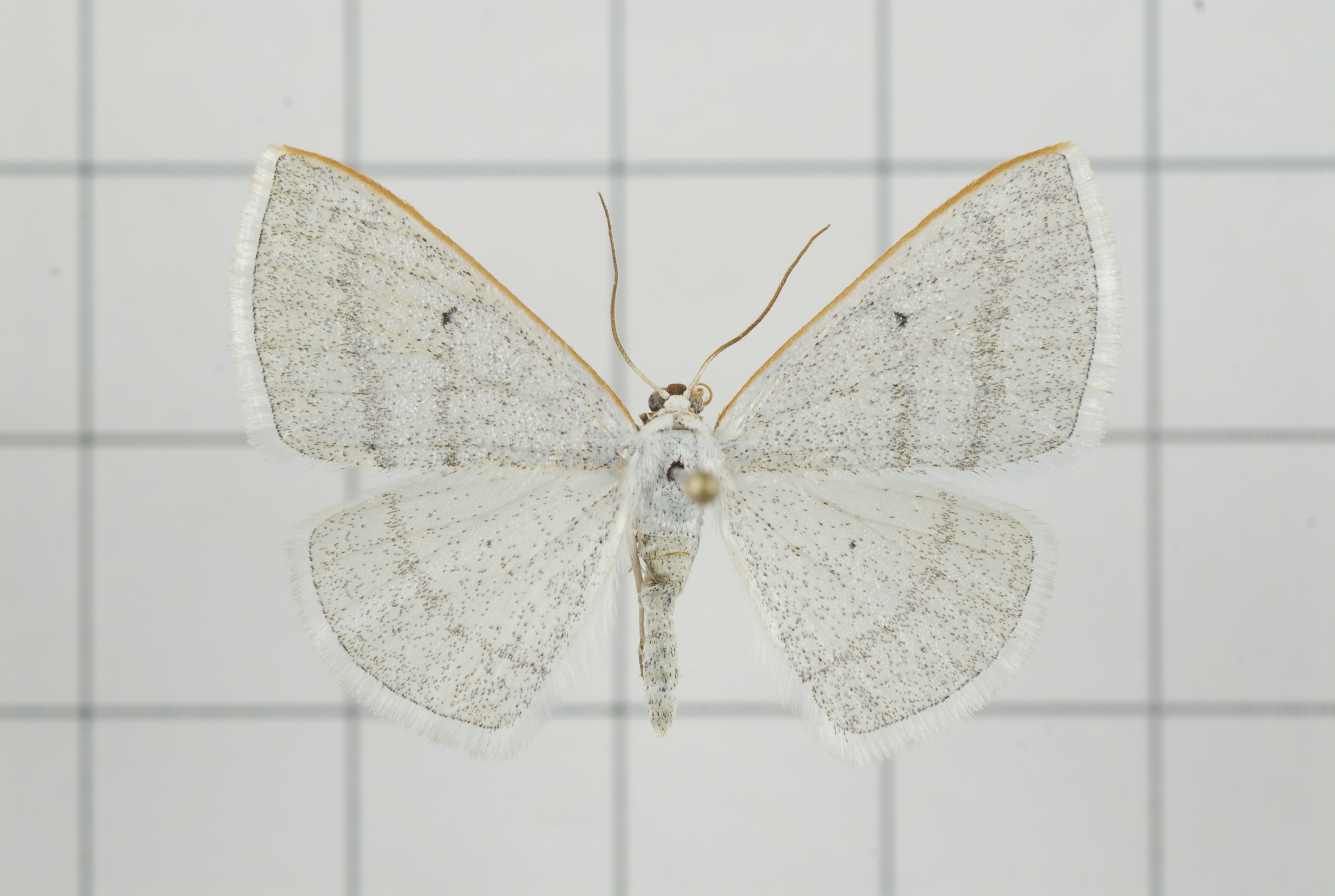
- Lomographa clariphennis

Scientific classification
- Kingdom: Animalia
- Phylum: Arthropoda
- Class: Insecta
- Order: Lepidoptera
- Family: Geometridae
- Genus: Lomographa
- Species: L. claripennis

Binomial name
- Lomographa claripennis Inoue, 1977

= Lomographa claripennis =

Species of moth

Lomographa claripennis is a moth in the family Geometridae first described by Hiroshi Inoue in 1977. It is found in Japan and Taiwan.
