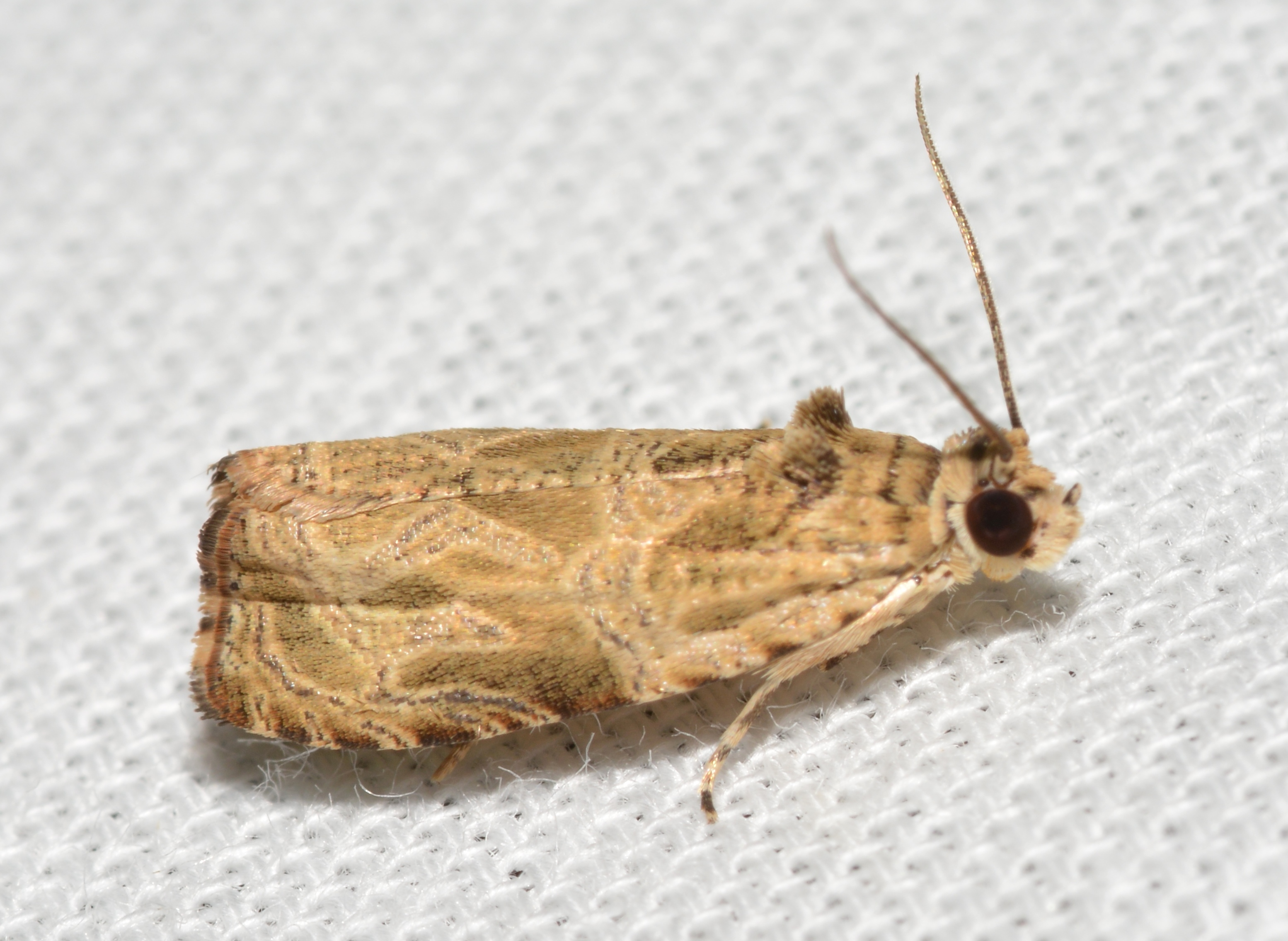

Scientific classification
- Kingdom: Animalia
- Phylum: Arthropoda
- Clade: Pancrustacea
- Class: Insecta
- Order: Lepidoptera
- Family: Tortricidae
- Genus: Olethreutes
- Species: O. permundana

Binomial name
- Olethreutes permundana (Clemens, 1860)

Synonyms
- Exartema permundana Clemens, 1860; Cymolomia gaylussaciana Kearfott, 1910; Sciaphila meanderana Walker, 1863

= Olethreutes permundana =

Species of moth

Olethreutes permundana, the raspberry leafroller, is a species of tortricid moth in the family Tortricidae. It is found in the eastern United States, south-eastern Canada and north-western North America. The species was described by James Brackenridge Clemens in 1860.

The wingspan is 17–22 mm.

The larvae are leaftiers and have been recorded on Spiraea salicifolia, Physocarpus opulifolius, Rubus hispidus, Rosa, Fragaria, Vaccinium pallidum, Gaylussacia, Rhus typhina, Corylus, Myrica and Carya.

The MONA or Hodges number for Olethreutes permundana is 2817.
