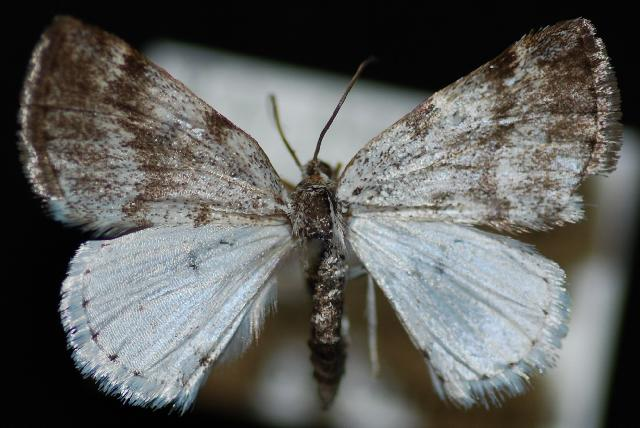

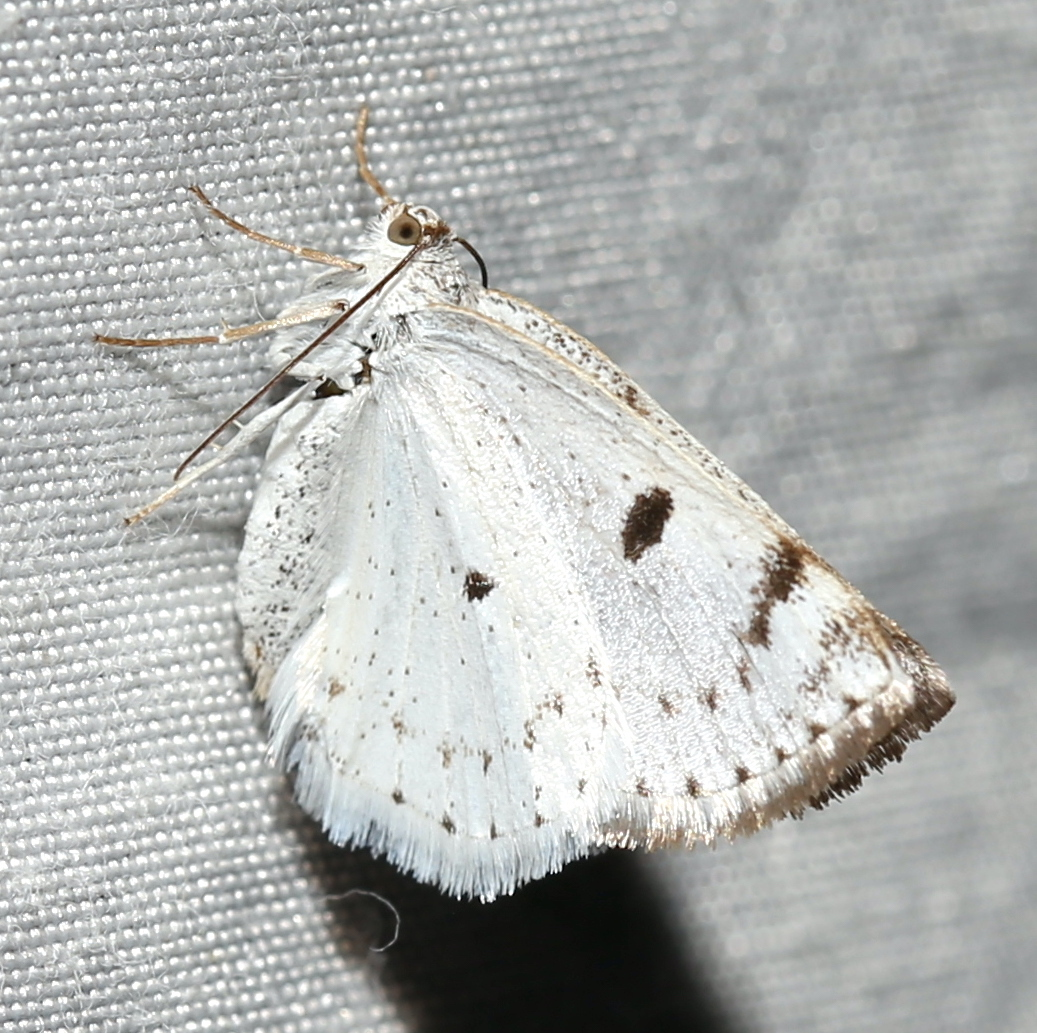

Scientific classification
- Kingdom: Animalia
- Phylum: Arthropoda
- Class: Insecta
- Order: Lepidoptera
- Family: Geometridae
- Genus: Lomographa
- Species: L. semiclarata

Binomial name
- Lomographa semiclarata (Walker, 1866)

= Lomographa semiclarata =

Species of moth

Lomographa semiclarata, known generally as the bluish spring moth or wild cherry looper, is a species of geometrid moth in the family Geometridae. It is found in North America.

The MONA or Hodges number for Lomographa semiclarata is 6666.
