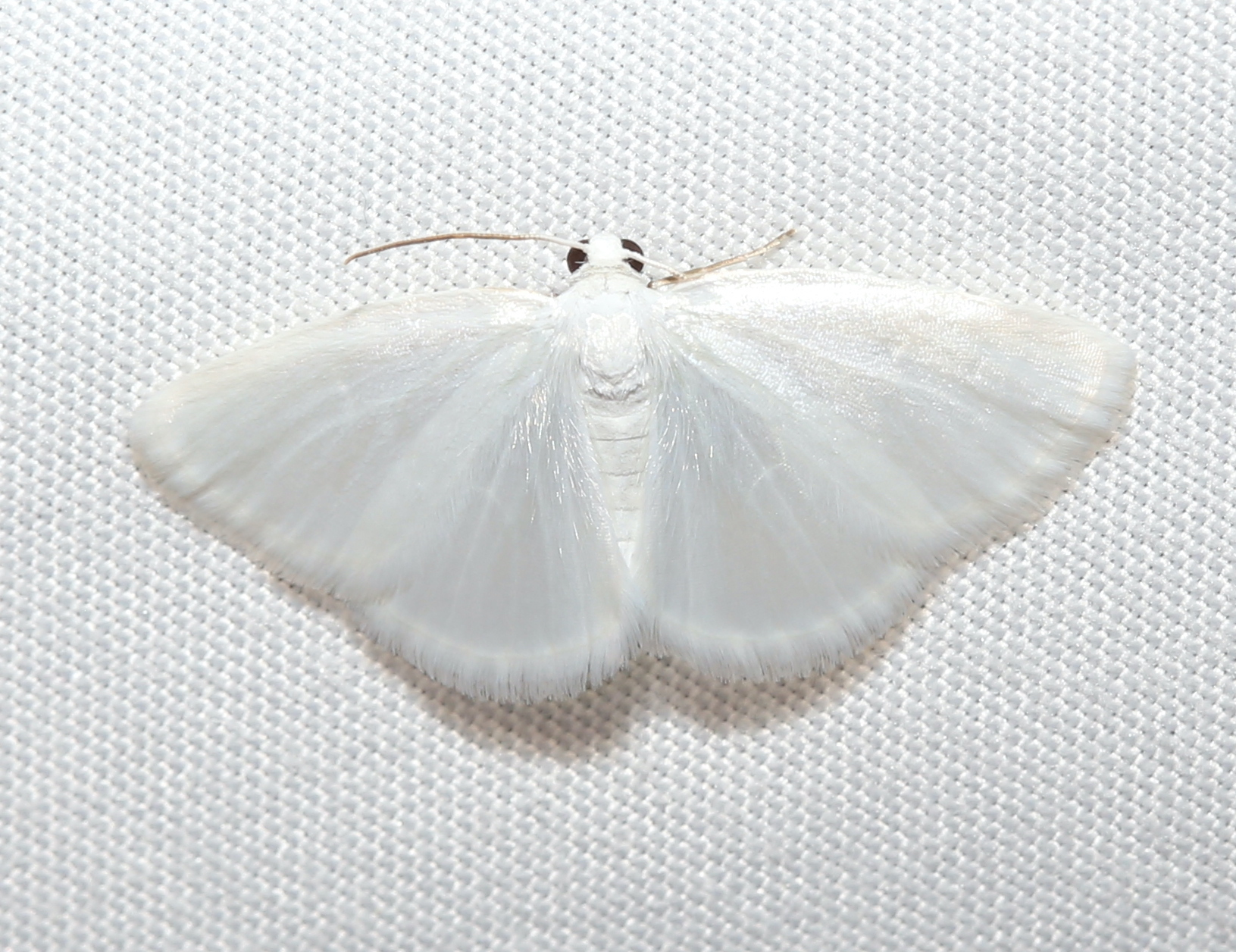

Scientific classification
- Kingdom: Animalia
- Phylum: Arthropoda
- Class: Insecta
- Order: Lepidoptera
- Family: Geometridae
- Genus: Lomographa
- Species: L. vestaliata

Binomial name
- Lomographa vestaliata (Guenee, 1857)

Synonyms
- Corycia vestaliata Guenee, 1857

= Lomographa vestaliata =

Species of moth

Lomographa vestaliata, Also known as white spring moth or Spring faerie, is a moth in the family Geometridae. The species was first described by Achille Guenée in 1857. Adults are diurnal and on wing in spring, usually found around the cestrum nocturnum tree, pollinating their flowers

== Description ==
The white spring moth has a wingspan of 15–23 mm and rests with its wings open, exposing both its forewings and hindwings. Its head, body and all four wings are solid white, lack markings and appear shiny or translucent. The outer margins of all four wings are fringed.

== Range and Habitat ==
It is found in North America, where it has been recorded in Newfoundland west, south-eastern British Columbia, south Florida, Texas and Mexico. The species prefers dry climates and their habitat consists of xeric shrubby edges and woodlands.

== Ecology ==
The larvae have been recorded feeding on Prunus, Cestrum,Crataegus, Sorbus, Malus, Physocarpus and Viburnum species.
