= Chemsakiella virgulata =

Scientific classification
- Domain: Eukaryota
- Kingdom: Animalia
- Phylum: Arthropoda
- Class: Insecta
- Order: Coleoptera
- Suborder: Polyphaga
- Infraorder: Cucujiformia
- Family: Cerambycidae
- Genus: Chemsakiella
- Species: C. virgulata

Binomial name
- Chemsakiella virgulata (Chemsak, 1987)

Species of beetle

Chemsakiella virgulata is a species of beetle in the family Cerambycidae. It was described by Chemsak in 1987.
