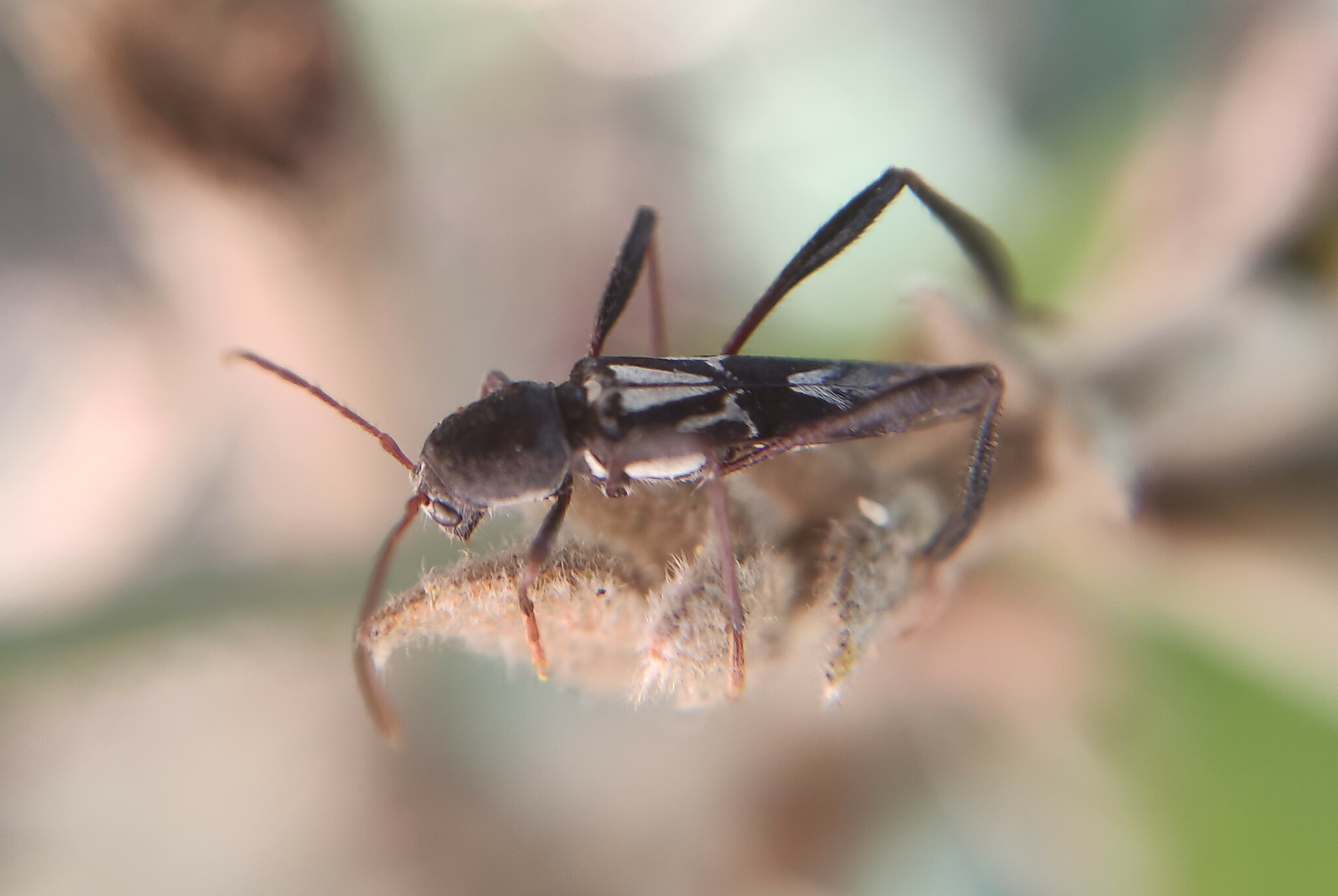
- Picture of Neoclytus ypsilon from iNaturalist

Scientific classification
- Kingdom: Animalia
- Phylum: Arthropoda
- Clade: Pancrustacea
- Class: Insecta
- Order: Coleoptera
- Suborder: Polyphaga
- Infraorder: Cucujiformia
- Family: Cerambycidae
- Genus: Neoclytus
- Species: N. ypsilon

Binomial name
- Neoclytus ypsilon Chevrolat, 1862

= Neoclytus ypsilon =

Species of beetle

Neoclytus ypsilon is a species of beetle in the family Cerambycidae. It was described by Chevrolat in 1862. It is found in Brazil (Goiás, São Paulo, Santa Catarina, Rio Grande do Sul), Paraguay, Argentina (Salta, Catamarca, Tucumán, Santiago del Estero, La Rioja, Córdoba, San Juán, Mendoza, Chaco, Misiones, Santa Fé, Corrientes, Entre Ríos, Buenos Aires) and Uruguay.
