= Neoclytus beltianus =

Scientific classification
- Kingdom: Animalia
- Phylum: Arthropoda
- Class: Insecta
- Order: Coleoptera
- Suborder: Polyphaga
- Infraorder: Cucujiformia
- Family: Cerambycidae
- Genus: Neoclytus
- Species: N. beltianus

Binomial name
- Neoclytus beltianus Bates, 1885

Species of beetle

Neoclytus beltianus is a species of beetle in the family Cerambycidae. It was described by Bates in 1885.
