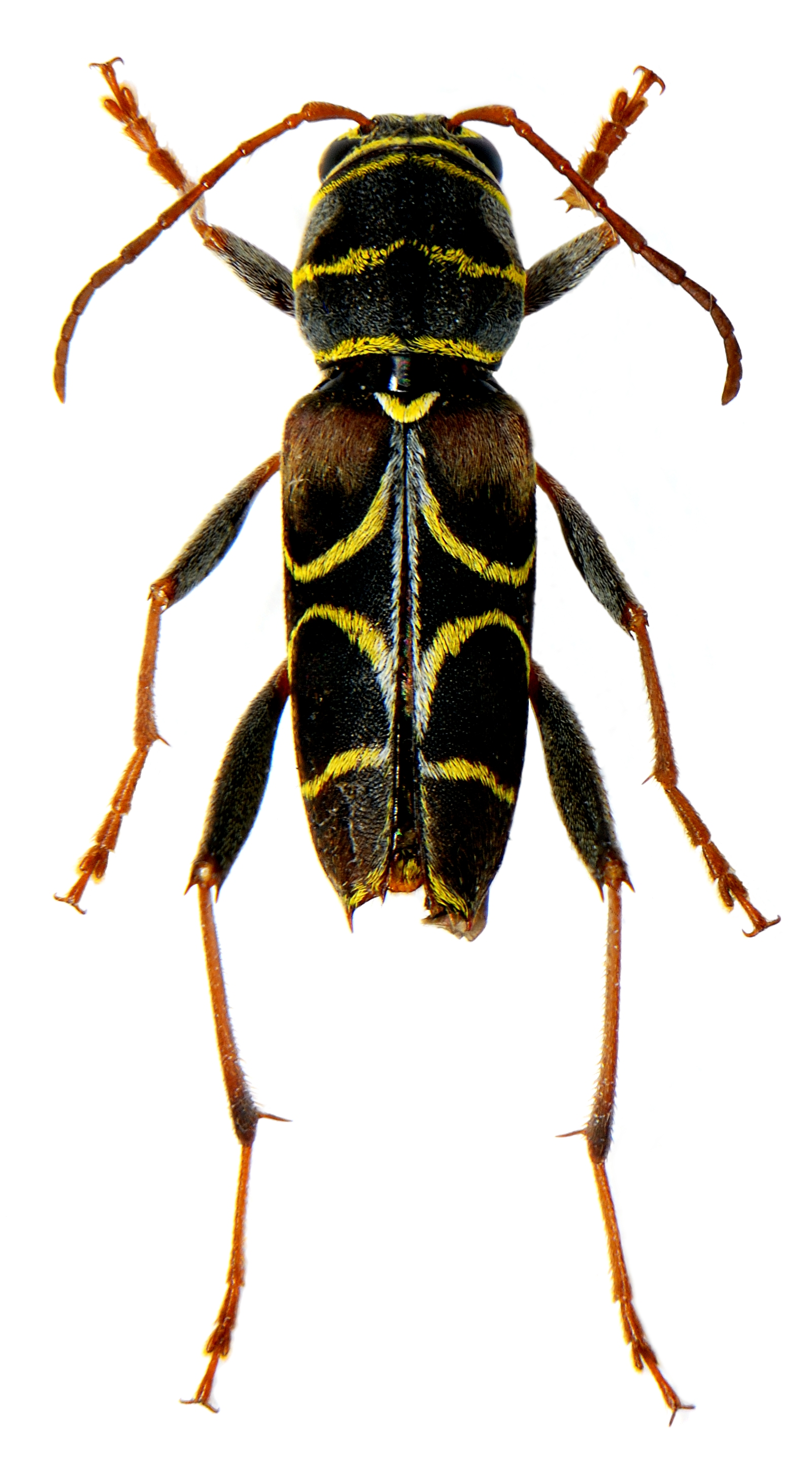

Scientific classification
- Kingdom: Animalia
- Phylum: Arthropoda
- Clade: Pancrustacea
- Class: Insecta
- Order: Coleoptera
- Suborder: Polyphaga
- Infraorder: Cucujiformia
- Family: Cerambycidae
- Genus: Neoclytus
- Species: N. scutellaris

Binomial name
- Neoclytus scutellaris (Olivier, 1790)

Synonyms
- Callidium scutellare Olivier, 1790; Clytus elegans Haldeman, 1847; Clytus luscus var. scutellaris (Olivier) White, 1855; Clytus scutellaris (Olivier) Schönherr, 1817

= Neoclytus scutellaris =

Species of beetle

Neoclytus scutellaris is a species of beetle in the family Cerambycidae. Described by Guillaume-Antoine Olivier in 1790, it is found in the United States.
