= Neoclytus englemani =

Scientific classification
- Kingdom: Animalia
- Phylum: Arthropoda
- Class: Insecta
- Order: Coleoptera
- Suborder: Polyphaga
- Infraorder: Cucujiformia
- Family: Cerambycidae
- Genus: Neoclytus
- Species: N. englemani

Binomial name
- Neoclytus englemani Giesbert, 1989

Species of beetle

Neoclytus englemani is a species of beetle in the family Cerambycidae. It was described by Giesbert in 1989. It can be found in Panama.
