= Neoclytus jibacoense =

Scientific classification
- Kingdom: Animalia
- Phylum: Arthropoda
- Class: Insecta
- Order: Coleoptera
- Suborder: Polyphaga
- Infraorder: Cucujiformia
- Family: Cerambycidae
- Genus: Neoclytus
- Species: N. jibacoense

Binomial name
- Neoclytus jibacoense Zayas, 1975

Species of beetle

Neoclytus jibacoense is a species of beetle in the family Cerambycidae. It was described by Zayas in 1975.
