= Neoclytus tenuiscriptus =

Scientific classification
- Kingdom: Animalia
- Phylum: Arthropoda
- Class: Insecta
- Order: Coleoptera
- Suborder: Polyphaga
- Infraorder: Cucujiformia
- Family: Cerambycidae
- Genus: Neoclytus
- Species: N. tenuiscriptus

Binomial name
- Neoclytus tenuiscriptus Fall, 1907

Species of beetle

Neoclytus tenuiscriptus is a species of beetle in the family Cerambycidae. It was described by Fall in 1907.
