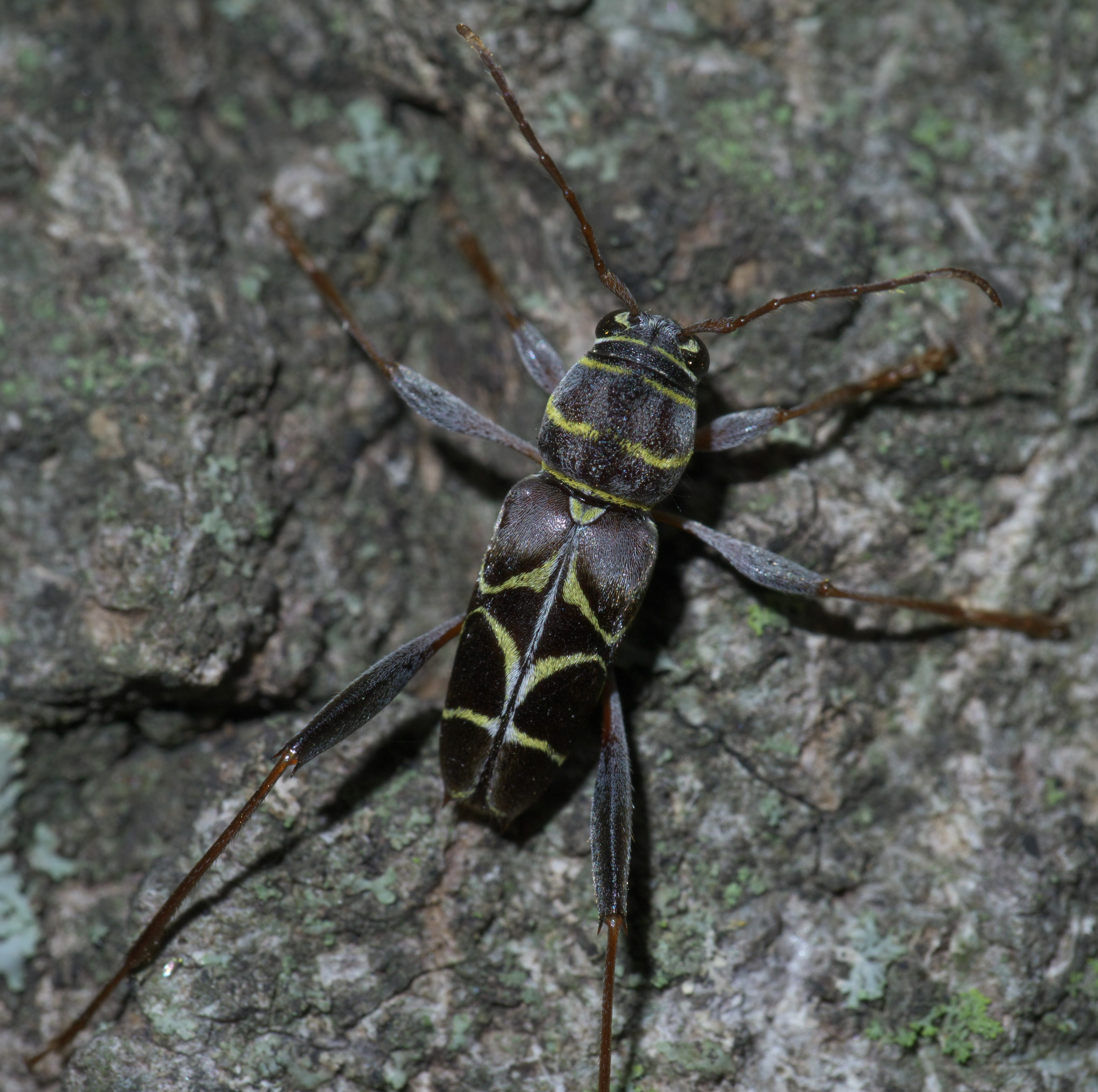
- Neoclytus scutellaris

Scientific classification
- Kingdom: Animalia
- Phylum: Arthropoda
- Class: Insecta
- Order: Coleoptera
- Suborder: Polyphaga
- Infraorder: Cucujiformia
- Family: Cerambycidae
- Subfamily: Cerambycinae
- Tribe: Clytini
- Genus: Neoclytus; Thomson, 1860

Synonyms
- Rhopalomerus Chevrolat, 1860; Rhopalopachys Chevrolat, 1860

= Neoclytus =

Genus of beetles

Neoclytus is a genus of beetles in the family Cerambycidae. They measure 4-20 mm. There are 93 species in the New World.

== Species ==
These 58 species belong to the genus Neoclytus:

- Neoclytus acteon (Chevrolat, 1860)^{c g}
- Neoclytus acuminatus (Fabricius, 1775)^{i c g b} (red-headed ash borer)
- Neoclytus anama Galileo & Martins, 2007^{c g}
- Neoclytus angelicus Van Dyke, 1927^{i c g}
- Neoclytus approximatus (LeConte, 1862)^{i c g b}
- Neoclytus araneiformis (Olivier, 1795)^{i c}
- Neoclytus ascendens LeConte, 1878^{i}
- Neoclytus augusti (Chevrolat, 1835)^{i c g b}
- Neoclytus bahamicus Cazier & Lacey, 1952^{c g}
- Neoclytus balteatus LeConte, 1873^{i c g b}
- Neoclytus beltianus Bates, 1885^{c g}
- Neoclytus cacicus (Chevrolat, 1860)^{c g}
- Neoclytus caprea (Say, 1824)^{i c g b} (banded ash borer)
- Neoclytus chevrolati (Castelnau & Gory, 1841)^{c g}
- Neoclytus clavipes (Chevrolat, 1860)^{c g}
- Neoclytus columbianus Fuchs, 1963
- Neoclytus conjunctus (LeConte, 1857)^{i c g b}
- Neoclytus cordifer (Klug, 1829)^{i b} (mangrove borer)
- Neoclytus curtulus (Chevrolat, 1860)^{c g}
- Neoclytus englemani Giesbert, 1989^{c g}
- Neoclytus fraterculus Martins & Galileo, 2008^{c g}
- Neoclytus guianensis (Laporte & Gory, 1835)
- Neoclytus hoegei (Bates, 1880)^{c g}
- Neoclytus horridus (LeConte, 1862)^{i c g b}
- Neoclytus impar (Germar, 1824)^{c g}
- Neoclytus interruptus LeConte, 1873^{i c g}
- Neoclytus irroratus (LeConte, 1858)^{i c g b}
- Neoclytus jibacoense Zayas, 1975^{c g}
- Neoclytus jouteli Davis, 1904^{i c g b}
- Neoclytus leucozonus (Laporte and Gory, 1835)^{i}
- Neoclytus longipes (Drury, 1773)^{i c}
- Neoclytus magnus Schaeffer 1904^{i c g b}
- Neoclytus modestus Fall, 1907^{i c g b}
- Neoclytus mucronatus (Fabricius, 1775)^{i c b}
- Neoclytus muricatulus (Kirby, 1837)^{c g b}
- Neoclytus nubilus Linsley, 1933^{i c g}
- Neoclytus pallidicornis Fisher, 1932^{c g}
- Neoclytus peninsularis Schaeffer, 1905^{c g}
- Neoclytus personatus Chemsak & Linsley, 1974^{c g}
- Neoclytus podagricus (White, 1855)^{c g}
- Neoclytus provoanus Casey, 1924^{i c g}
- Neoclytus pubicollis Fisher, 1932^{c g}
- Neoclytus purus Bates, 1885^{c g}
- Neoclytus pusillus (Castelnau & Gory, 1841)^{c g}
- Neoclytus resplendens Linsley, 1935^{i c g b}
- Neoclytus rufitarsis (Chevrolat, 1860)^{c g}
- Neoclytus rufus (Olivier, 1795)^{c g}
- Neoclytus scutellaris (Olivier, 1790)^{i c g b}
- Neoclytus senilis (Fabricius, 1798)^{c g}
- Neoclytus smithi Bates, 1892^{c g}
- Neoclytus steelei Chemsak & Linsley, 1978^{c g}
- Neoclytus tenuiscriptus Fall, 1907^{i c g b} (seepwillow borer)
- Neoclytus torquatus LeConte, 1873^{i c g b}
- Neoclytus unicolor (Castelnau & Gory, 1841)^{c g}
- Neoclytus vanduzeei Van Dyke, 1927^{i c g b}
- Neoclytus vitellinus Martins & Galileo, 2008^{c g}
- Neoclytus ypsilon Chevrolat, 1862^{c g}
- Neoclytus zonatus Martins & Galileo, 2008^{c g}

Data sources: i = ITIS, c = Catalogue of Life, g = GBIF, b = Bugguide.net

== Gallery ==
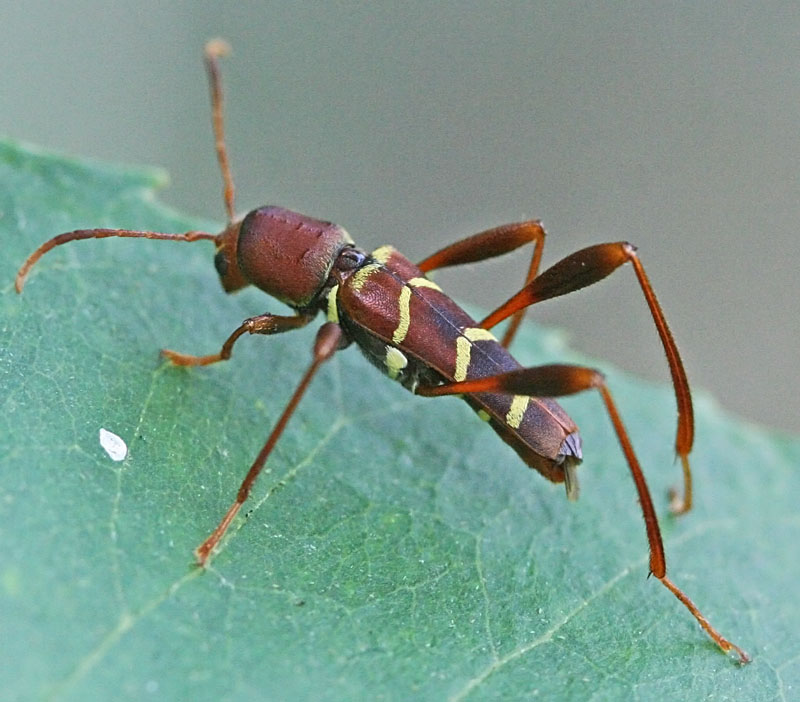
Neoclytus acuminatus

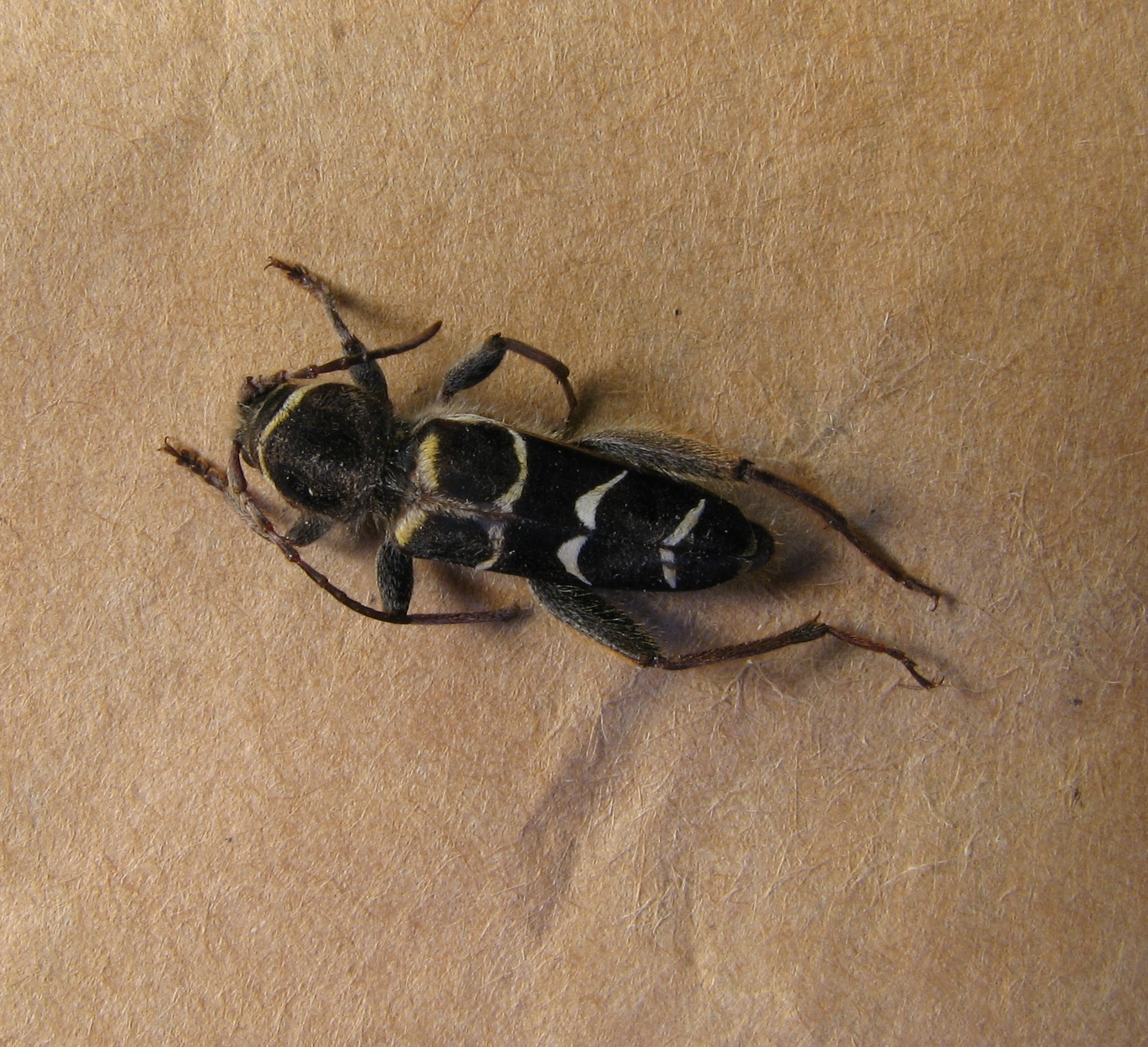
Neoclytus caprea

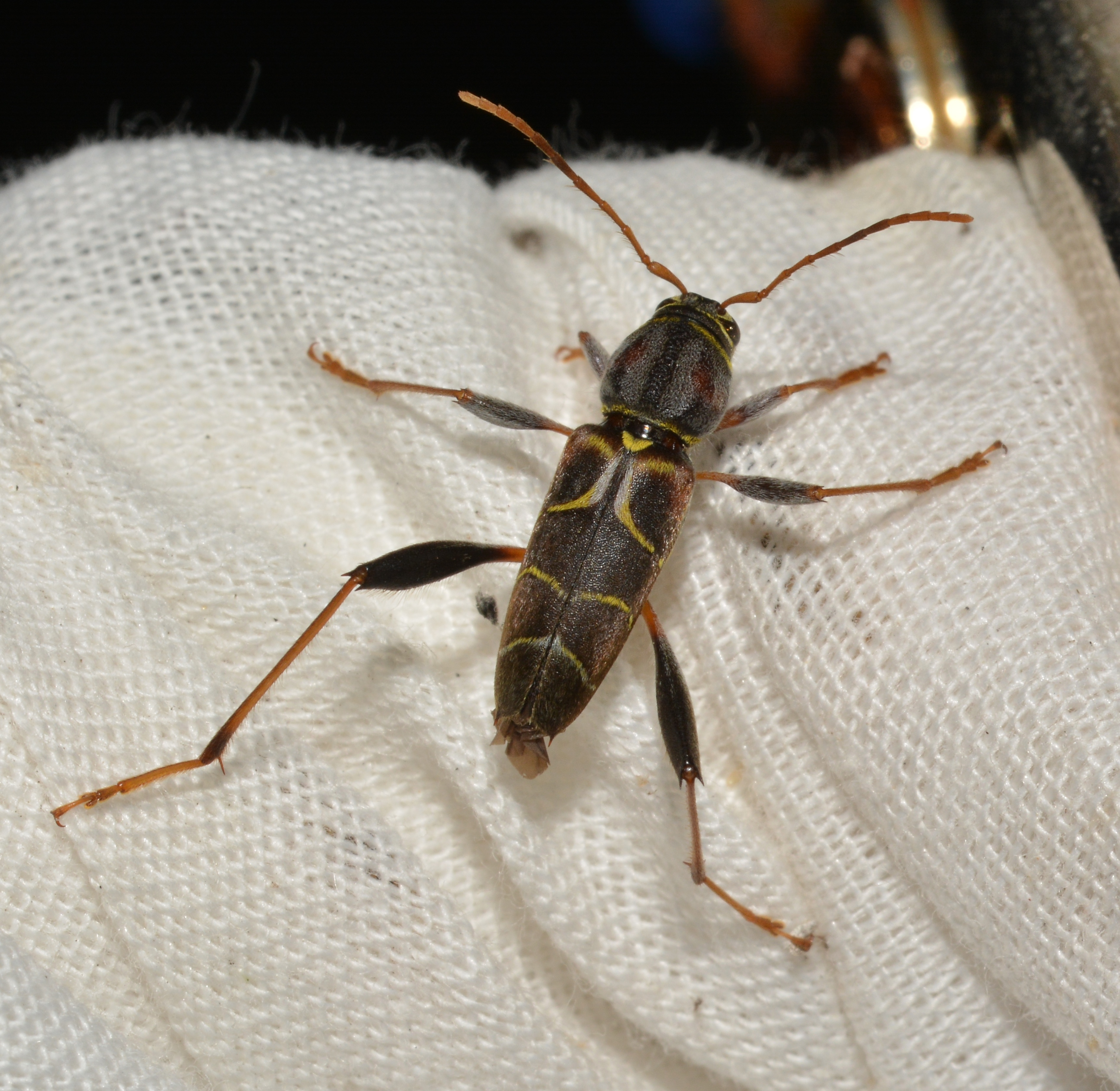
Neoclytus mucronatus
