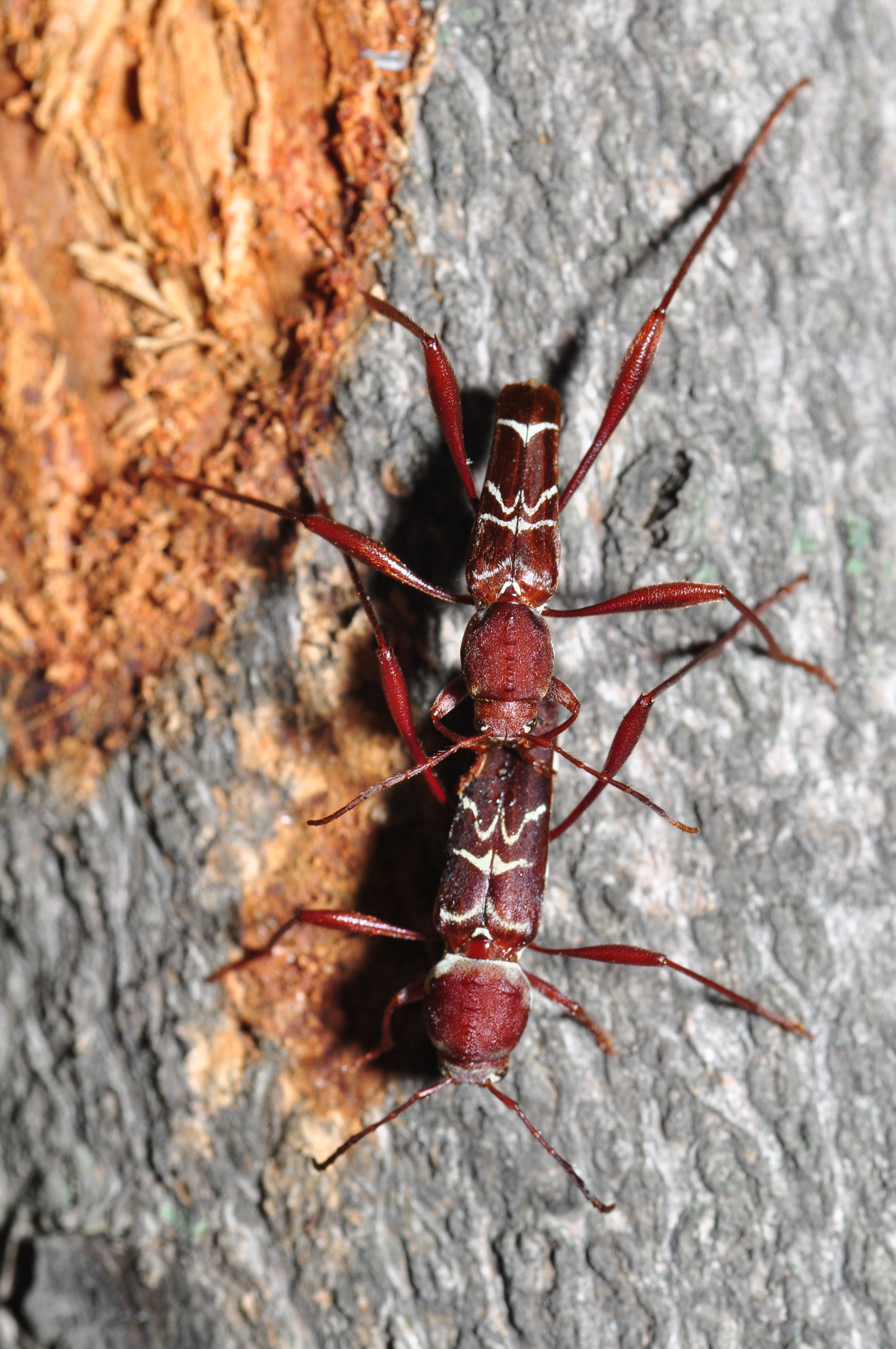
- Neoclytus purus

Scientific classification
- Kingdom: Animalia
- Phylum: Arthropoda
- Clade: Pancrustacea
- Class: Insecta
- Order: Coleoptera
- Suborder: Polyphaga
- Infraorder: Cucujiformia
- Family: Cerambycidae
- Genus: Neoclytus
- Species: N. purus

Binomial name
- Neoclytus purus Bates, 1885

= Neoclytus purus =

Species of beetle

Neoclytus purus is a species of beetle in the family Cerambycidae. It was described by Bates in 1885.
