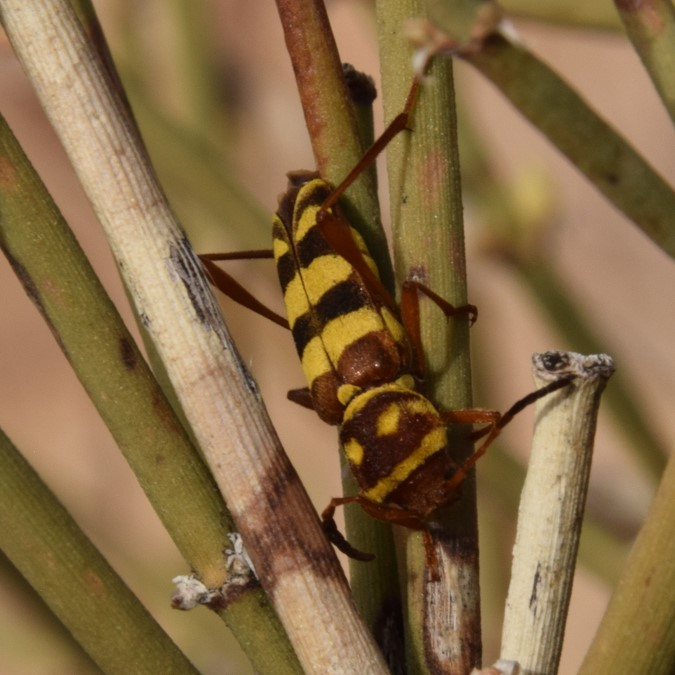

Scientific classification
- Kingdom: Animalia
- Phylum: Arthropoda
- Class: Insecta
- Order: Coleoptera
- Suborder: Polyphaga
- Infraorder: Cucujiformia
- Family: Cerambycidae
- Genus: Neoclytus
- Species: N. provoanus

Binomial name
- Neoclytus provoanus Casey, 1924

= Neoclytus provoanus =

Species of beetle

Neoclytus provoanus is a species of beetle in the family Cerambycidae. It was described by Casey in 1924.
