= Neoclytus curtulus =

Scientific classification
- Kingdom: Animalia
- Phylum: Arthropoda
- Class: Insecta
- Order: Coleoptera
- Suborder: Polyphaga
- Infraorder: Cucujiformia
- Family: Cerambycidae
- Genus: Neoclytus
- Species: N. curtulus

Binomial name
- Neoclytus curtulus (Chevrolat, 1860)

Species of beetle

Neoclytus curtulus is a species of beetle in the family Cerambycidae. It was described by Chevrolat in 1860.
