= Neoclytus resplendens =

Scientific classification
- Kingdom: Animalia
- Phylum: Arthropoda
- Clade: Pancrustacea
- Class: Insecta
- Order: Coleoptera
- Suborder: Polyphaga
- Infraorder: Cucujiformia
- Family: Cerambycidae
- Genus: Neoclytus
- Species: N. resplendens

Binomial name
- Neoclytus resplendens Linsley, 1935

Species of beetle

Neoclytus resplendens is a species of beetle in the family Cerambycidae. It was described by Linsley in 1935.
