= Neoclytus pubicollis =

Scientific classification
- Kingdom: Animalia
- Phylum: Arthropoda
- Class: Insecta
- Order: Coleoptera
- Suborder: Polyphaga
- Infraorder: Cucujiformia
- Family: Cerambycidae
- Genus: Neoclytus
- Species: N. pubicollis

Binomial name
- Neoclytus pubicollis Fisher, 1932

Species of beetle

Neoclytus pubicollis is a species of beetle in the family Cerambycidae. It was described by Fisher in 1932.
