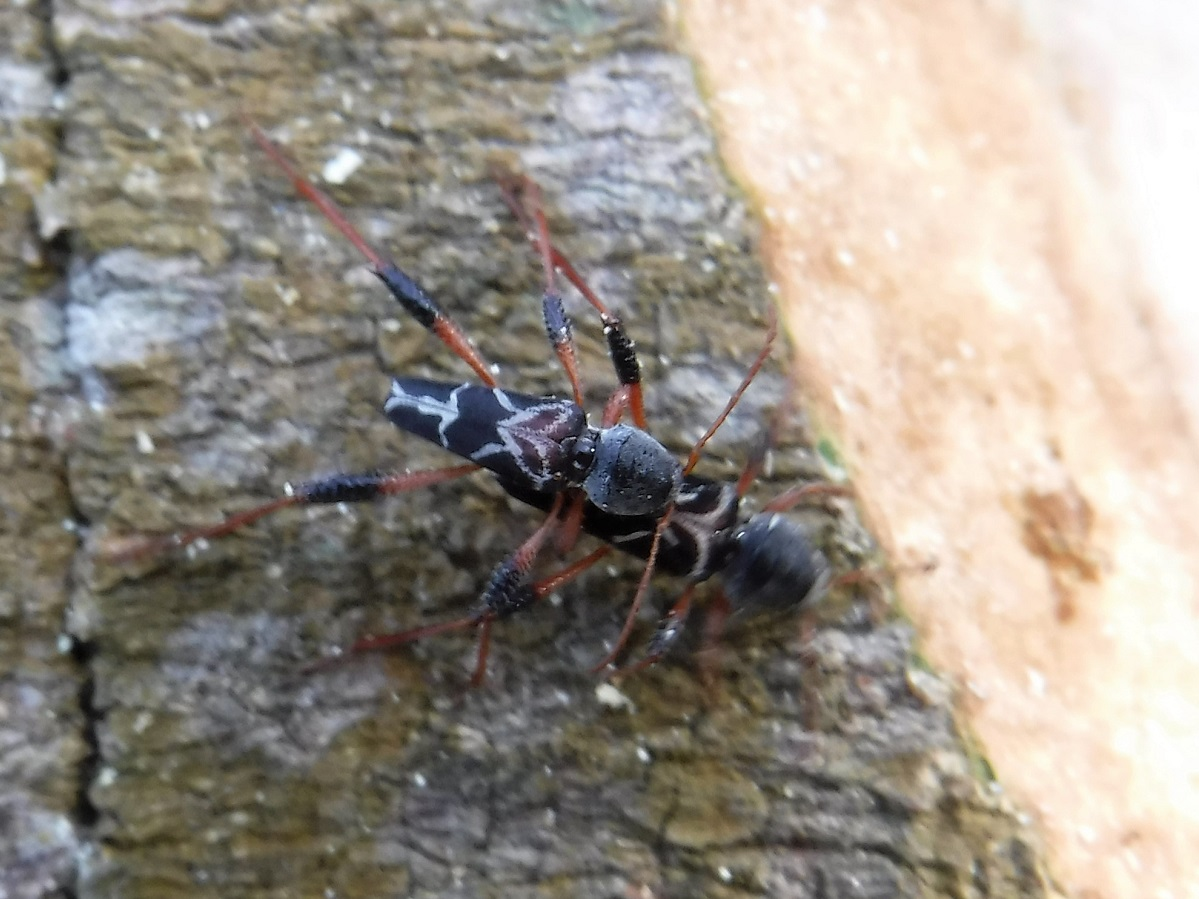

Scientific classification
- Kingdom: Animalia
- Phylum: Arthropoda
- Clade: Pancrustacea
- Class: Insecta
- Order: Coleoptera
- Suborder: Polyphaga
- Infraorder: Cucujiformia
- Family: Cerambycidae
- Genus: Neoclytus
- Species: N. araneiformis

Binomial name
- Neoclytus araneiformis (Olivier, 1795)

= Neoclytus araneiformis =

Species of beetle

Neoclytus araneiformis is a species of beetle in the family Cerambycidae. It was described by Guillaume-Antoine Olivier in 1795.
