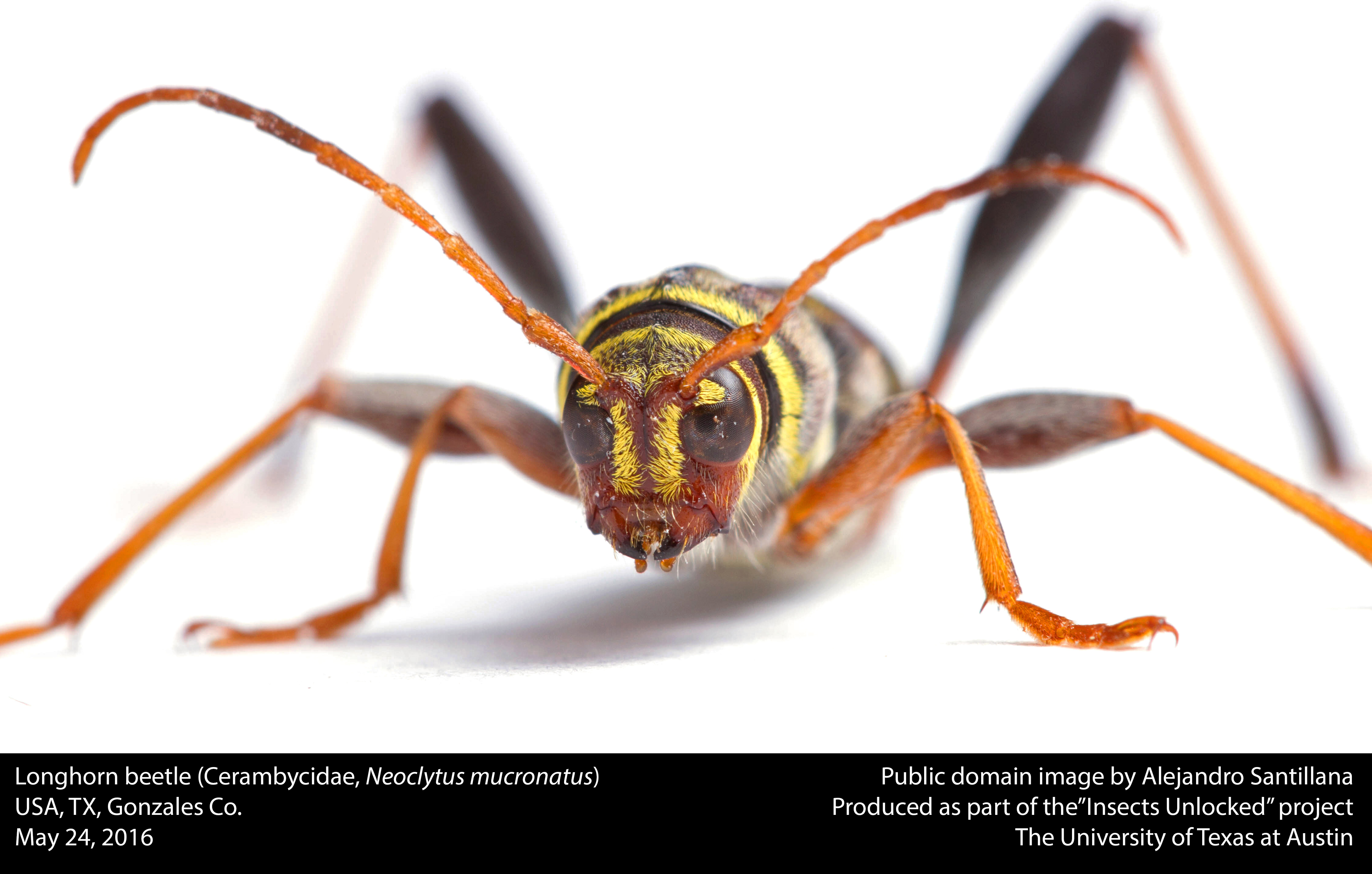

Scientific classification
- Kingdom: Animalia
- Phylum: Arthropoda
- Class: Insecta
- Order: Coleoptera
- Suborder: Polyphaga
- Infraorder: Cucujiformia
- Family: Cerambycidae
- Genus: Neoclytus
- Species: N. mucronatus

Binomial name
- Neoclytus mucronatus (Fabricius, 1775)

= Neoclytus mucronatus =

Species of beetle

Neoclytus mucronatus is a species of beetle in the family Cerambycidae. It was described by Johan Christian Fabricius in 1775.
