= Neoclytus leucozonus =

Scientific classification
- Kingdom: Animalia
- Phylum: Arthropoda
- Class: Insecta
- Order: Coleoptera
- Suborder: Polyphaga
- Infraorder: Cucujiformia
- Family: Cerambycidae
- Genus: Neoclytus
- Species: N. leucozonus

Binomial name
- Neoclytus leucozonus Laporte and Gory, 1835

Species of beetle

Neoclytus leucozonus is a beetle in the family Cerambycidae. It is native to continental United States and Canada.
