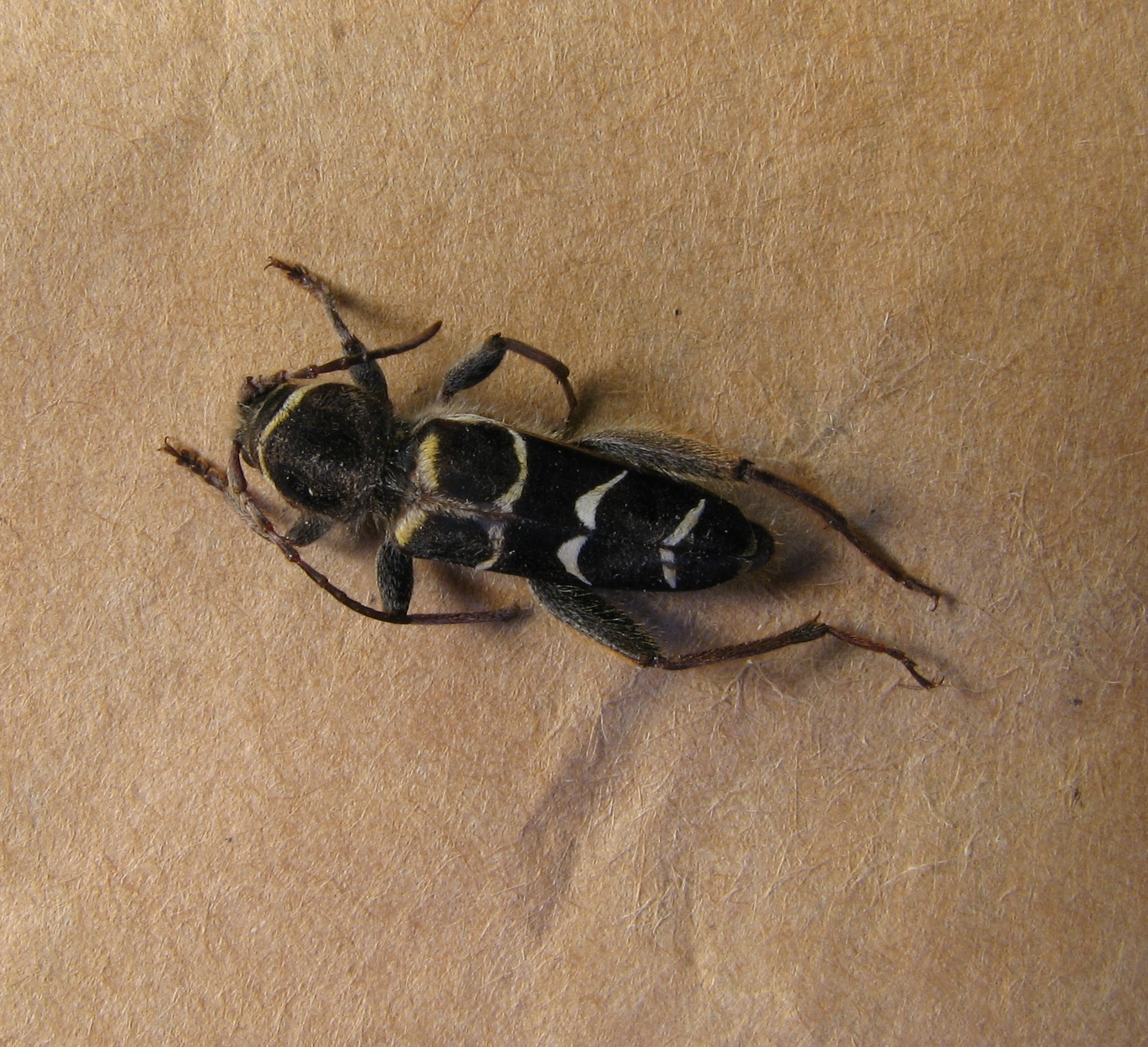

Scientific classification
- Kingdom: Animalia
- Phylum: Arthropoda
- Clade: Pancrustacea
- Class: Insecta
- Order: Coleoptera
- Suborder: Polyphaga
- Infraorder: Cucujiformia
- Family: Cerambycidae
- Genus: Neoclytus
- Species: N. caprea

Binomial name
- Neoclytus caprea (Say, 1824)

= Neoclytus caprea =

Species of beetle

Neoclytus caprea, commonly known as the banded ash borer, is a species of beetle in the family Cerambycidae. It feeds on the sapwood of ash, oak, and hickory. It often emerges indoors from firewood; logs may become infested within 20 days of felling in summer. The banded ash borer exhibits sexual dimorphism, as the female is considerably larger than the male and has yellow and black elytra coloring rather than the male's white and black coloring. It produces one generation a year.

The flight period of the banded ash borer, which is triggered by seasonal phenological mechanisms, prevents the species from being cross-attracted to sympatric species with similar or identical pheromone chemical compositions. N. caprea emerges and flies from its host species in early spring, much earlier than species that possess 3R-ketol compounds in their chemical composition, resulting in negligible overlap between flight periods of sympatric species. This effectively isolates the banded ash borer, preventing the possibility of cross attraction.

== Etymology ==
Neoclytus caprea is identified colloquially by the name banded ash borer in reference to one of its common host plants, the ash tree, which it infests and feeds on. The word banded refers to the distinct banded pattern on the back of its elytra and abdomen, setting this species of beetle apart from others.

== Description ==
Adult body sizes generally range from 8–17 mm in length, although some individuals as large as 25 mm have been recorded. Larval body sizes can reach up to 22 mm in length. Neoclytus caprea has elongated, narrow bodies with yellow and black striped abdomens similar to those of wasps or hornets. Sexual dimorphism is prevalent in Neoclytus caprea. Females are considerably larger than males of the species and have yellow and black banded markings on their elytra, unlike males, which have white and black banded markings. The top two bands on its elytra loop together to produce two circular shapes similar to eyes. There is a distinct band behind its head that distinguishes Neoclytus caprea from similar species. Both females and males have red-orange legs covered in white hairs. Their thoraxes and heads are also covered in the same white hairs.

== Diet ==
As its name suggests, a common and preferred host plant of the banded ash borer is the ash tree. This is likely due to the uniquely low levels of tannins produced by the ash tree, which make it more palatable to the banded ash borer. Larvae bore into the sapwood of ash trees, which they feed on during the summer. Unlike other species in the genus that typically prefer freshly felled or weakened trees, Neoclytus caprea seems to favor wood that has been left to dry of its moisture and sap.

The banded ash borer can also be found feeding on hickory, elm, mesquite, and occasionally oak. Some sources have identified wild grape trees, walnut trees, and palo blanco trees as possible alternate host plants on which the banded ash borer has been observed feeding.

== Life history ==
N. caprea adults emerge in early spring for their flight period, between March and June, from late morning to mid-afternoon. During this period, they search for a suitable new host plant and deposit their eggs in the bark. The larvae feed beneath the bark for some time before boring into the sapwood and feeding on it for the remainder of the summer season. They do not pupate until fall, and in spring they emerge from the wood as fully mature adults to repeat the cycle. N. caprea produces a single generation per year.

== Distribution ==
Neoclytus caprea is native to North America and can be found throughout the United States, except along the Pacific coast, and its distribution also extends into eastern Canada.

== Physiology ==
The physiology of Neoclytus caprea encompasses various sensory and physiological mechanisms that contribute to its survival and reproductive success within its habitat.

=== Flight ===
Adult Neoclytus caprea exhibit remarkable flight capabilities, facilitated by well-developed wings and powerful flight muscles. These traits allow the species to disperse over significant distances in search of suitable host plants for feeding and oviposition. Studies have shown that it can cover several kilometers during its lifetime, contributing to genetic exchange and population dynamics within its range.

=== Vision ===
Neoclytus caprea possesses a complex visual system, including specialized photoreceptors that enable it to perceive light and distinguish between different colors in its environment. Its vision is particularly acute during the daylight hours, aiding in mate selection, predator avoidance, and navigation during flight. The ability to detect colors and patterns also plays a crucial role in identifying potential mates and locating suitable host plants.

=== Defensive appearance ===
Neoclytus caprea has conspicuous coloring and patterning on its elytra and abdomen that can make it particularly visible to predators and susceptible to predation as a result. In some cases, unpalatable and toxic prey develop or evolve bright, conspicuous coloring to deter predators from consuming them. Unpleasant taste is gained through specialized diets that are often high in alkaloids and other unfavorable compounds. After consuming unpalatable prey, predators will avoid those prey due to their knowledge of its unpleasant taste. For these prey, it is advantageous to have conspicuous coloring that allows them to be easily identified and avoided by predators.

However, Neoclytus caprea prefers a diet of ash trees, which are distinctly low in tannins and therefore more palatable. This generalized diet of palatable host material means that its highly visible nature can be dangerous for its survival. However, due to the distinct yellow and black banding on its abdomen and on the elytra of females, its overt visibility can sometimes be beneficial to Neoclytus caprea. This is likely because it exhibits Batesian mimicry, in which unpalatable prey evolve the coloring and appearance of distasteful species, such as wasps, to avoid predation. Its elongated and slender body assists in mimicking its target species. Predators will avoid similar prey models if they know one of them is noxious and distasteful. The high contrast and conspicuous coloring in this species could also serve as an effective warning sign that it is toxic, even if it is not. This is a defensive strategy known as aposematism.

=== Olfactory cues ===
Males of Neoclytus caprea produce and secrete pheromones containing 3R-ketol compounds that attract both sexes of conspecific beetles. Many other species in the genus have similar or even identical pheromone compositions that might cause inter-species interactions. This is prevented by seasonal phenological mechanisms that cause N. caprea to fly in early spring and avoid sympatric species with similar male pheromone compositions, effectively isolating it from 3R-ketol-producing species. Seasonal phenology segregates species so that they may have similar pheromone compositions but rarely interact.

The banded ash borer also demonstrates the development of olfactory mechanisms due to its emergence and proximity to species with dissimilar male pheromone compositions. The development of its olfactory system suggests strong selective forces against cross attraction and for mate location.

Studies found that Neoclytus caprea is not influenced by compounds such as COHs, syn-diols, anti-diols, and 2-MB found in other species in proximity to it during its flight period. Neoclytus caprea may utilize these olfactory mechanisms to avoid sexual interactions with sympatric species, or its olfactory system may not detect or recognize the olfactory cues of certain species, preventing it from registering them as possible mating partners. These olfactory mechanisms enable the banded ash borer to locate and identify suitable mating partners. The effects of host plant volatiles on attraction and mating in Neoclytus caprea were also studied; researchers found that host plant volatiles inhibited attraction in this hardwood-feeding species of beetle. There is still no definite explanation for why host plant volatiles induce this response in the attraction of banded ash borers.

=== Taste ===
Gustatory receptors in Neoclytus caprea allow it to assess the palatability of potential food sources and distinguish between favorable and unfavorable substrates for feeding and oviposition. These receptors are particularly sensitive to chemical cues present in the sapwood of host trees such as ash, hickory, and oak. By sampling and evaluating various food sources, individuals can optimize their foraging behavior and reproductive success.

=== Hearing ===
While the auditory capabilities of N. caprea have not been extensively studied, it likely possesses sensory organs for detecting sound vibrations. These auditory cues may play a role in communication, predator detection, or navigation in its environment.

=== Thermosensation ===
N. caprea may possess thermosensory mechanisms that allow it to detect temperature variations in its surroundings. These sensory adaptations could influence its behavior and activity patterns in response to environmental cues such as temperature gradients or thermal cues associated with potential mate locations or suitable habitat areas. Thermosensation also plays a role in regulating metabolic processes and energy expenditure in response to changing environmental conditions.

=== Digestion ===
The digestive system of Neoclytus caprea is adapted to process cellulose-rich plant material, particularly the sapwood of host trees. Specialized enzymes produced in the beetle's gut facilitate the breakdown of cellulose into simpler compounds that can be absorbed and used for energy. This efficient digestion of woody plant material allows Neoclytus caprea to exploit a niche resource and thrive in habitats where suitable host trees are abundant.

=== Microbiome ===
The gut microbiome of Neoclytus caprea likely plays a significant role in digestion and nutrient absorption. Microbial communities residing in the beetle's digestive tract may assist in the breakdown of complex plant polysaccharides, enhance nutrient extraction, and contribute to overall digestive efficiency. While specific microbial species and their functions remain to be fully elucidated, the gut microbiome is an integral component of the beetle's digestive physiology.
