= Neoclytus steelei =

Scientific classification
- Kingdom: Animalia
- Phylum: Arthropoda
- Class: Insecta
- Order: Coleoptera
- Suborder: Polyphaga
- Infraorder: Cucujiformia
- Family: Cerambycidae
- Genus: Neoclytus
- Species: N. steelei

Binomial name
- Neoclytus steelei Chemsak & Linsley, 1978

Species of beetle

Neoclytus steelei is a species of beetle in the family Cerambycidae. It was described by Chemsak and Linsley in 1978.
