= Neoclytus irroratus =

Scientific classification
- Kingdom: Animalia
- Phylum: Arthropoda
- Class: Insecta
- Order: Coleoptera
- Suborder: Polyphaga
- Infraorder: Cucujiformia
- Family: Cerambycidae
- Genus: Neoclytus
- Species: N. irroratus

Binomial name
- Neoclytus irroratus (LeConte, 1858)

Species of beetle

Neoclytus irroratus is a species of beetle in the family Cerambycidae. It was described by John Lawrence LeConte in 1858.
