= Neoclytus cordifer =

Scientific classification
- Kingdom: Animalia
- Phylum: Arthropoda
- Class: Insecta
- Order: Coleoptera
- Suborder: Polyphaga
- Infraorder: Cucujiformia
- Family: Cerambycidae
- Genus: Neoclytus
- Species: N. cordifer

Binomial name
- Neoclytus cordifer (Klug, 1829)

Synonyms
- Neoclytus devastator (Laporte and Gory, 1835); Neoclytus rufescens (Laporte and Gory, 1835)

Species of beetle

Neoclytus cordifer, the mangrove borer, is a species of long-horned beetle in the family Cerambycidae.
