= Chemsakiella ricei =

Scientific classification
- Domain: Eukaryota
- Kingdom: Animalia
- Phylum: Arthropoda
- Class: Insecta
- Order: Coleoptera
- Suborder: Polyphaga
- Infraorder: Cucujiformia
- Family: Cerambycidae
- Genus: Chemsakiella
- Species: C. ricei

Binomial name
- Chemsakiella ricei (Chemsak, 1984)

Species of beetle

Chemsakiella ricei is a species of beetle in the family Cerambycidae. It was described by Chemsak in 1984.
