= Neoclytus anama =

Scientific classification
- Kingdom: Animalia
- Phylum: Arthropoda
- Class: Insecta
- Order: Coleoptera
- Suborder: Polyphaga
- Infraorder: Cucujiformia
- Family: Cerambycidae
- Genus: Neoclytus
- Species: N. anama

Binomial name
- Neoclytus anama Galileo & Martins, 2007

Species of beetle

Neoclytus anama is a species of beetle in the family Cerambycidae. It was described by Galileo and Martins in 2007.
