= Neoclytus jouteli =

Scientific classification
- Kingdom: Animalia
- Phylum: Arthropoda
- Class: Insecta
- Order: Coleoptera
- Suborder: Polyphaga
- Infraorder: Cucujiformia
- Family: Cerambycidae
- Genus: Neoclytus
- Species: N. jouteli

Binomial name
- Neoclytus jouteli Davis, 1904

Species of beetle

Neoclytus jouteli is a species of beetle in the family Cerambycidae. It was described by Donald R. DavisDonald R. Davis in 1904.
