= Neoclytus interruptus =

Scientific classification
- Kingdom: Animalia
- Phylum: Arthropoda
- Clade: Pancrustacea
- Class: Insecta
- Order: Coleoptera
- Suborder: Polyphaga
- Infraorder: Cucujiformia
- Family: Cerambycidae
- Genus: Neoclytus
- Species: N. interruptus

Binomial name
- Neoclytus interruptus LeConte, 1873

Species of beetle

Neoclytus interruptus is a species of beetle in the family Cerambycidae. It was described by John Lawrence LeConte in 1873.
