= Neoclytus smithi =

Scientific classification
- Kingdom: Animalia
- Phylum: Arthropoda
- Class: Insecta
- Order: Coleoptera
- Suborder: Polyphaga
- Infraorder: Cucujiformia
- Family: Cerambycidae
- Genus: Neoclytus
- Species: N. smithi

Binomial name
- Neoclytus smithi Bates, 1892

Species of beetle

Neoclytus smithi is a species of beetle in the family Cerambycidae. It was described by Bates in 1892.
