= Neoclytus angelicus =

Scientific classification
- Kingdom: Animalia
- Phylum: Arthropoda
- Class: Insecta
- Order: Coleoptera
- Suborder: Polyphaga
- Infraorder: Cucujiformia
- Family: Cerambycidae
- Genus: Neoclytus
- Species: N. angelicus

Binomial name
- Neoclytus angelicus Van Dyke, 1927

Species of beetle

Neoclytus angelicus is a species of beetle in the family Cerambycidae. It was described by Van Dyke in 1927.
