= Neoclytus columbianus =

Scientific classification
- Kingdom: Animalia
- Phylum: Arthropoda
- Class: Insecta
- Order: Coleoptera
- Suborder: Polyphaga
- Infraorder: Cucujiformia
- Family: Cerambycidae
- Genus: Neoclytus
- Species: N. columbianus

Binomial name
- Neoclytus columbianus E. Fuchs, 1963

Species of beetle

Neoclytus columbianus is a species of beetle in the family Cerambycidae. It was described by Ernst Fuchs in 1963.
