= Neoclytus hoegei =

Scientific classification
- Kingdom: Animalia
- Phylum: Arthropoda
- Class: Insecta
- Order: Coleoptera
- Suborder: Polyphaga
- Infraorder: Cucujiformia
- Family: Cerambycidae
- Genus: Neoclytus
- Species: N. hoegei

Binomial name
- Neoclytus hoegei (Bates, 1880)

Species of beetle

Neoclytus hoegei is a species of beetle in the family Cerambycidae. It was described by Bates in 1880.
