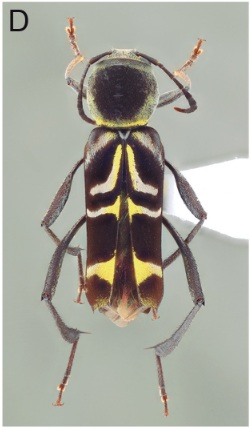

Scientific classification
- Kingdom: Animalia
- Phylum: Arthropoda
- Clade: Pancrustacea
- Class: Insecta
- Order: Coleoptera
- Suborder: Polyphaga
- Infraorder: Cucujiformia
- Family: Cerambycidae
- Genus: Neoclytus
- Species: N. pusillus

Binomial name
- Neoclytus pusillus (Laporte & Gory, 1835)

Synonyms
- Clytus pusillus Laporte & Gory, 1841; Clytus guianensis Laporte & Gory, 1841; Neoclytus tapajonus Bates, 1870

= Neoclytus pusillus =

Species of beetle

Neoclytus pusillus is a species of beetle in the family Cerambycidae. It was described by Laporte and Gory in 1835. It is found in Venezuela, Colombia, Peru, Bolivia, Suriname, French Guiana, Brazil, Paraguay, Argentina and Uruguay.
