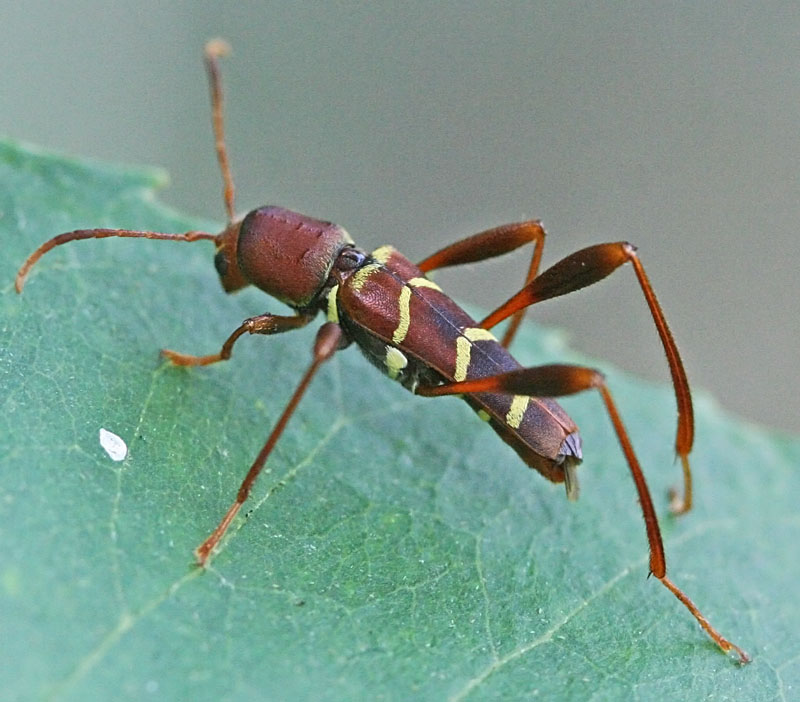
- Neoclytus acuminatus adult on the leaf of an ash tree

Scientific classification
- Kingdom: Animalia
- Phylum: Arthropoda
- Clade: Pancrustacea
- Class: Insecta
- Order: Coleoptera
- Suborder: Polyphaga
- Infraorder: Cucujiformia
- Family: Cerambycidae
- Genus: Neoclytus
- Species: N. acuminatus

Binomial name
- Neoclytus acuminatus (Fabricius, 1775)

= Neoclytus acuminatus =

Species of beetle

Neoclytus acuminatus, the red-headed ash borer, is a common North American species in the longhorn beetle family (Cerambycidae).

== Description and ecology ==
Red-headed ash borers typically reach 12–16 mm (0.47–0.63 in) adult length, have long antennae which are thickened towards the tips, and have the rear and middle pairs of legs elongated. The reddish-brown coloration with four bands of contrasting yellow stripes and the general body shape mimics wasps, which is a common survival tactic among cerambycids.

Adults emerge from infested trees in early spring, typically ash, hickory and oak, but also use other hardwoods and sometimes shrubs and woody vines. The larvae feed on the sapwood of dead trees, with several generations possible over the summer before overwintering again, probably in the pupal stage.

== Significance ==
The red-headed ash borer usually develops in recently dead or dying hardwood trees, so the most common impact on humans is damage to felled trees intended for hardwood lumber or firewood. These insects are commonly brought into homes with firewood and may emerge, but do no physical damage to the home. This species has been known to infest weak or newly planted living trees and is a pest of nursery stock in some areas. The feeding of the larvae may cut off sap flow, and in some cases weaken the trunk of young trees making them more susceptible to wind damage. Adults emerge from the tree, leaving behind round holes.

In natural settings, red-headed ash borers contribute to healthy forests by hastening the decomposition of dead and dying timber, making more nutrients and space available for healthy plants.

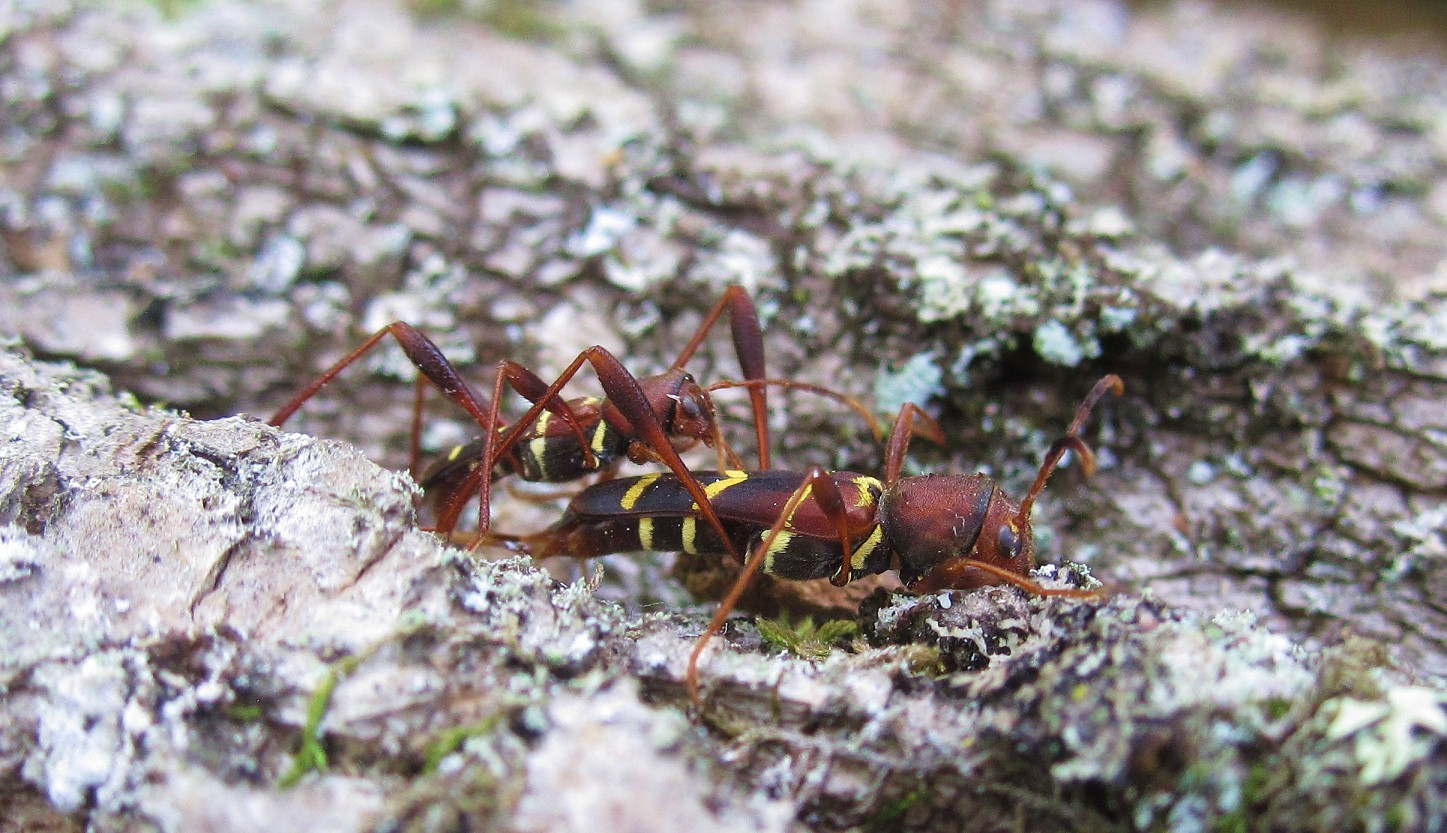
Red-headed ash borer (Neoclytus acuminatus) mating pair
