= Neoclytus unicolor =

Scientific classification
- Kingdom: Animalia
- Phylum: Arthropoda
- Class: Insecta
- Order: Coleoptera
- Suborder: Polyphaga
- Infraorder: Cucujiformia
- Family: Cerambycidae
- Genus: Neoclytus
- Species: N. unicolor

Binomial name
- Neoclytus unicolor (Laporte & Gory, 1835)

Species of beetle

Neoclytus unicolor is a species of beetle in the family Cerambycidae. It was described by Laporte and Gory in 1835.
