= Neoclytus balteatus =

Scientific classification
- Kingdom: Animalia
- Phylum: Arthropoda
- Class: Insecta
- Order: Coleoptera
- Suborder: Polyphaga
- Infraorder: Cucujiformia
- Family: Cerambycidae
- Genus: Neoclytus
- Species: N. balteatus

Binomial name
- Neoclytus balteatus LeConte, 1873

Species of beetle

Neoclytus balteatus is a species of beetle in the family Cerambycidae. It was described by John Lawrence LeConte in 1873.
