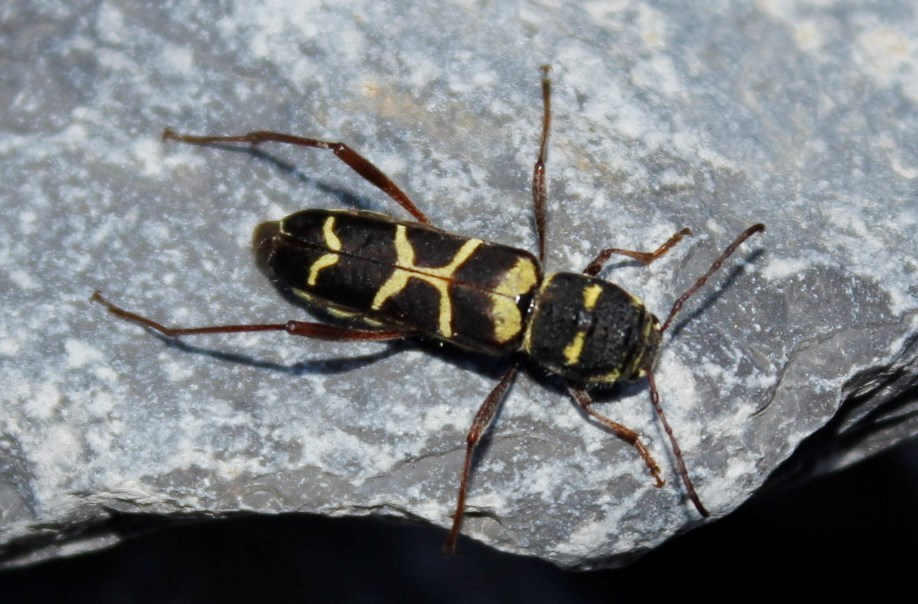

Scientific classification
- Kingdom: Animalia
- Phylum: Arthropoda
- Class: Insecta
- Order: Coleoptera
- Suborder: Polyphaga
- Infraorder: Cucujiformia
- Family: Cerambycidae
- Genus: Neoclytus
- Species: N. torquatus

Binomial name
- Neoclytus torquatus LeConte, 1873

= Neoclytus torquatus =

Species of beetle

Neoclytus torquatus is a species of beetle in the family Cerambycidae. It was first described by John Lawrence LeConte in 1873.
