= Neoclytus impar =

Scientific classification
- Kingdom: Animalia
- Phylum: Arthropoda
- Class: Insecta
- Order: Coleoptera
- Suborder: Polyphaga
- Infraorder: Cucujiformia
- Family: Cerambycidae
- Genus: Neoclytus
- Species: N. impar

Binomial name
- Neoclytus impar (Germar, 1824)

Species of beetle

Neoclytus impar is a species of beetle in the family Cerambycidae. It was described by Ernst Friedrich Germar in 1824.
