= Neoclytus zonatus =

Scientific classification
- Kingdom: Animalia
- Phylum: Arthropoda
- Class: Insecta
- Order: Coleoptera
- Suborder: Polyphaga
- Infraorder: Cucujiformia
- Family: Cerambycidae
- Genus: Neoclytus
- Species: N. zonatus

Binomial name
- Neoclytus zonatus Martins & Galileo, 2008

Species of beetle

Neoclytus zonatus is a species of beetle in the family Cerambycidae. It was described by Martins and Galileo in 2008.
