= Neoclytus nubilus =

Scientific classification
- Kingdom: Animalia
- Phylum: Arthropoda
- Class: Insecta
- Order: Coleoptera
- Suborder: Polyphaga
- Infraorder: Cucujiformia
- Family: Cerambycidae
- Genus: Neoclytus
- Species: N. nubilus

Binomial name
- Neoclytus nubilus Linsley, 1933

Species of beetle

Neoclytus nubilus is a species of beetle in the family Cerambycidae. It was described by Linsley in 1933.
