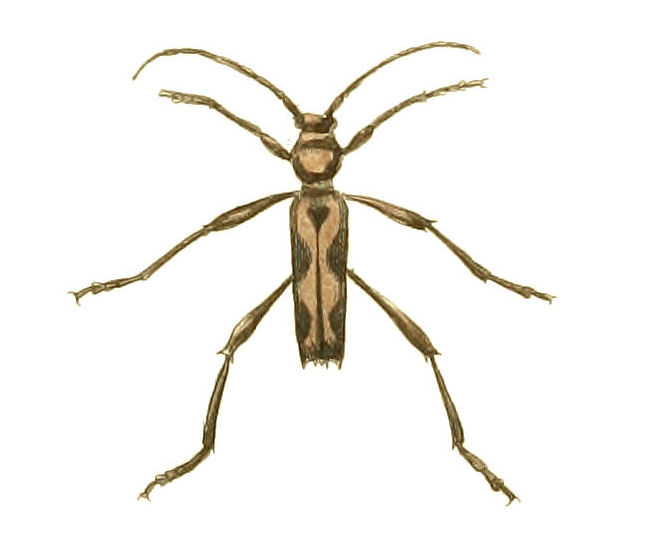

Scientific classification
- Kingdom: Animalia
- Phylum: Arthropoda
- Class: Insecta
- Order: Coleoptera
- Suborder: Polyphaga
- Infraorder: Cucujiformia
- Family: Cerambycidae
- Genus: Neoclytus
- Species: N. longipes

Binomial name
- Neoclytus longipes (Drury, 1773)

= Neoclytus longipes =

Species of beetle

Neoclytus longipes is a species of beetle in the family Cerambycidae. It was described by Dru Drury in 1773.

== Description ==
General colour dark red brown. Antennae about half the length of the insect. Thorax cylindrical and covered with a fine short down or hair; having on each side a small tubercle or swelling, without any spine. Scutellum small, and semi oval. Elytra parti coloured; the lighter parts (as seen in the plate) being covered with the same kind of short hair as the thorax; with four spines at their extremities, the two inner ones being the smallest. Abdomen with three yellow spots on each side, and another at the anus. The body has likewise a large spot on each side, and another near the breast, joining to the middle legs. Four hindlegs long. Femora rough, with two short spines at the tips. Tibiae with two spurs. Length about one inch (25 mm).
