= Chemsakiella =

Scientific classification
- Domain: Eukaryota
- Kingdom: Animalia
- Phylum: Arthropoda
- Class: Insecta
- Order: Coleoptera
- Suborder: Polyphaga
- Infraorder: Cucujiformia
- Family: Cerambycidae
- Subfamily: Cerambycinae
- Tribe: Trachyderini
- Genus: Chemsakiella; Monné, 2006

Synonyms
- Linsleyella Chemsak, 1984 (Preocc.)

Genus of beetles

Chemsakiella is a genus of beetles in the family Cerambycidae, containing the following species:

- Chemsakiella michelbacheri (Chemsak, 1984)
- Chemsakiella ricei (Chemsak, 1984)
- Chemsakiella virens (Bates, 1885)
- Chemsakiella virgulata (Chemsak, 1987)
