= Graphisurus eucharis =

Scientific classification
- Kingdom: Animalia
- Phylum: Arthropoda
- Class: Insecta
- Order: Coleoptera
- Suborder: Polyphaga
- Infraorder: Cucujiformia
- Family: Cerambycidae
- Genus: Graphisurus
- Species: G. eucharis

Binomial name
- Graphisurus eucharis (Bates, 1885)

Species of beetle

Graphisurus eucharis is a species of longhorn beetles of the subfamily Lamiinae. It was described by Henry Walter Bates in 1885, and is known from Guatemala and Panama.
