= Graphisurus vexillaris =

Scientific classification
- Kingdom: Animalia
- Phylum: Arthropoda
- Class: Insecta
- Order: Coleoptera
- Suborder: Polyphaga
- Infraorder: Cucujiformia
- Family: Cerambycidae
- Genus: Graphisurus
- Species: G. vexillaris

Binomial name
- Graphisurus vexillaris (Bates, 1872)

Species of beetle

Graphisurus vexillaris is a species of longhorn beetles of the subfamily Lamiinae. It was described by Bates in 1872, and is known from eastern Mexico and Panama.
