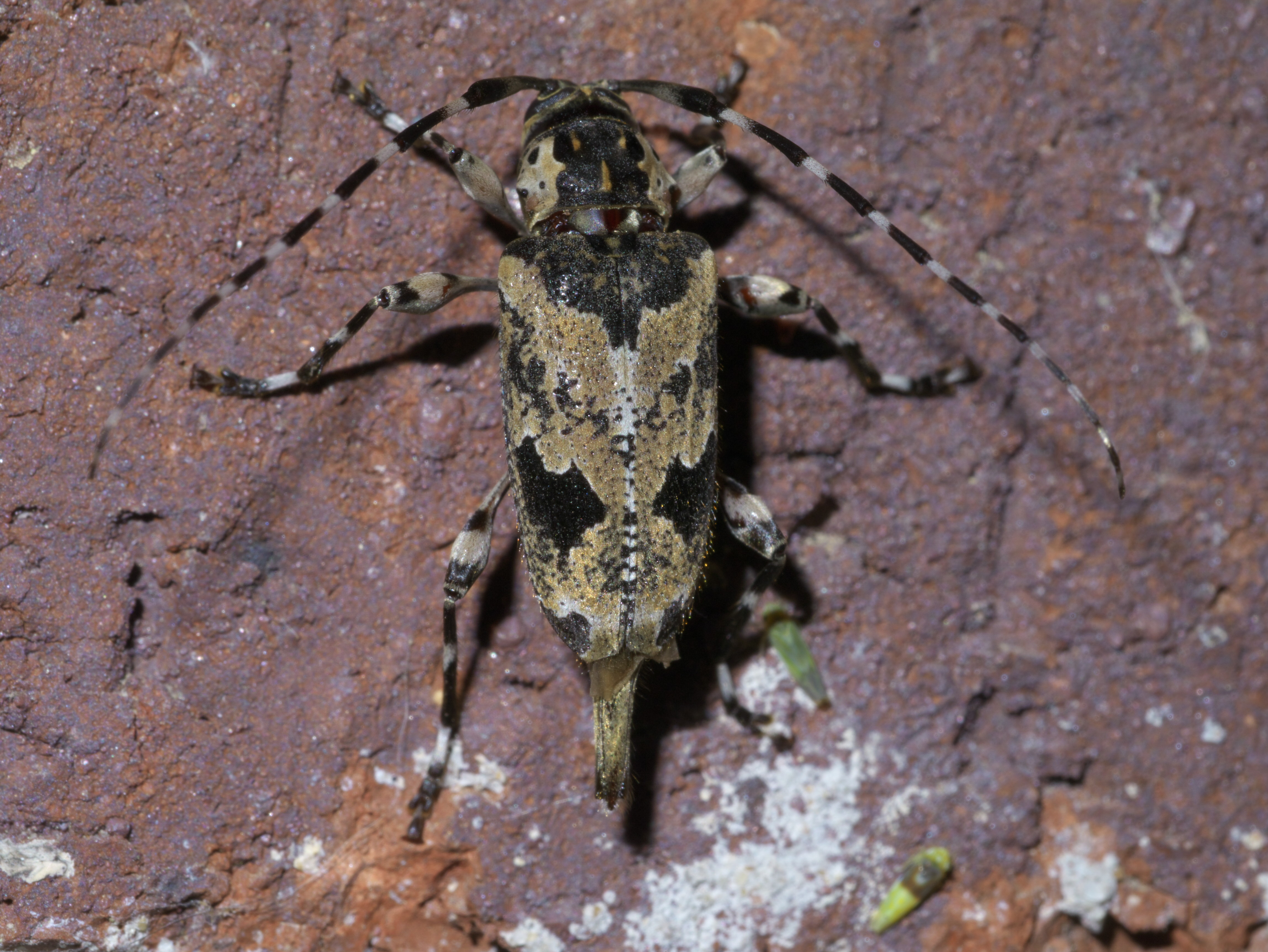

Scientific classification
- Kingdom: Animalia
- Phylum: Arthropoda
- Class: Insecta
- Order: Coleoptera
- Suborder: Polyphaga
- Infraorder: Cucujiformia
- Family: Cerambycidae
- Genus: Graphisurus
- Species: G. triangulifer

Binomial name
- Graphisurus triangulifer (Haldeman, 1847)

= Graphisurus triangulifer =

Species of beetle

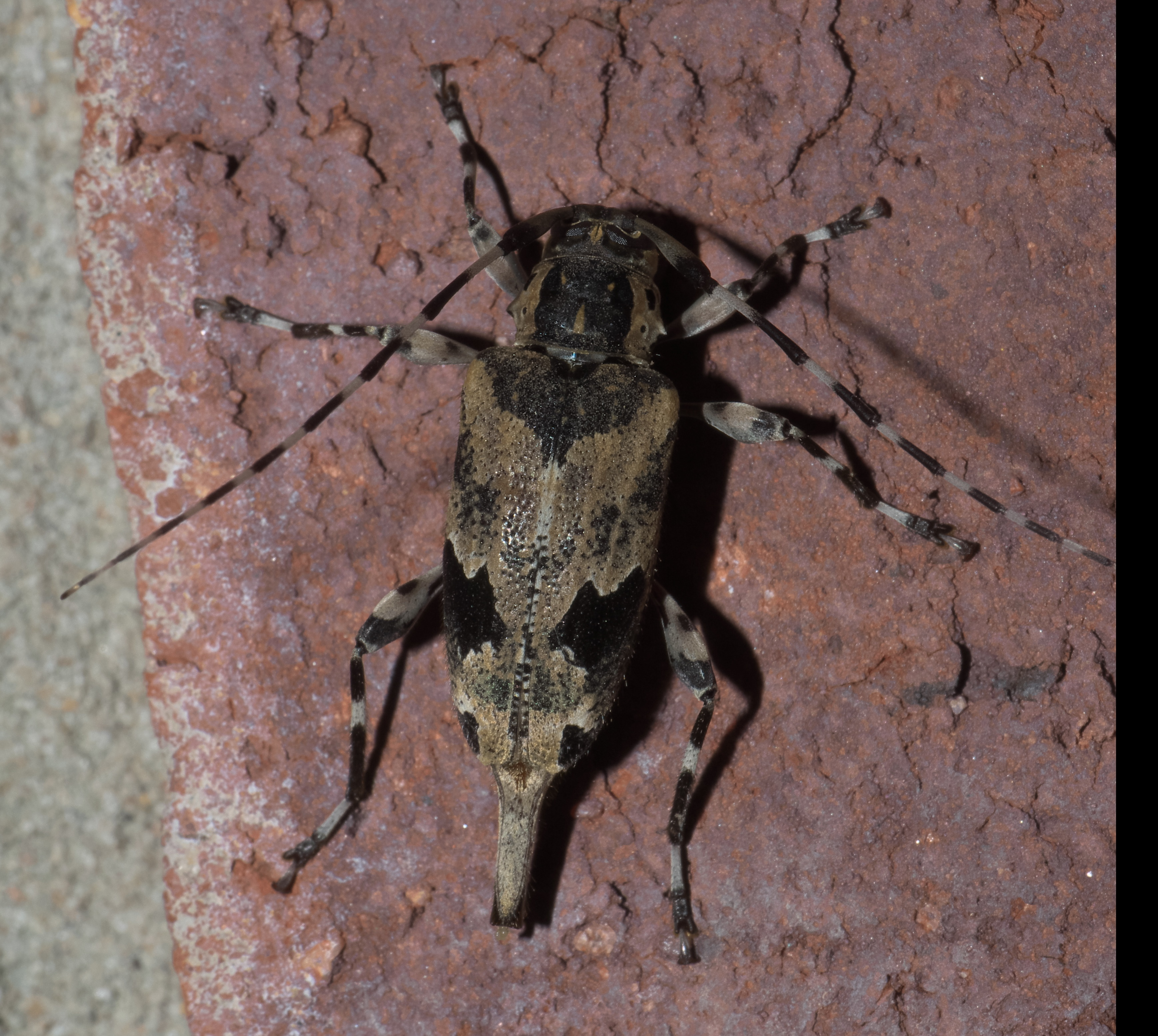
Graphisurus triangulifer, female

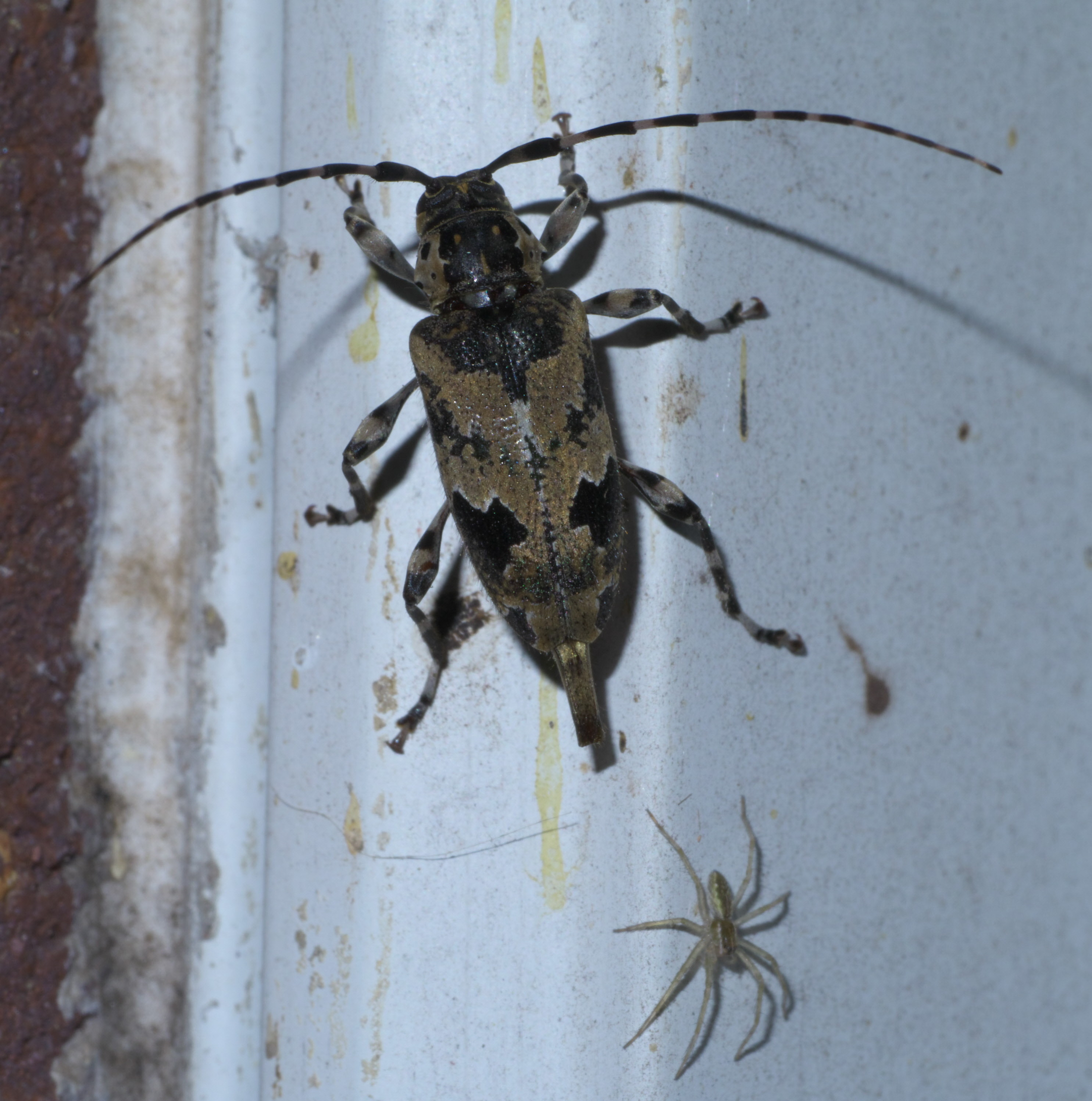
Graphisurus triangulifer

Graphisurus triangulifer is a species of longhorn beetles of the subfamily Lamiinae. It was described by Haldeman in 1847, and is known from the eastern United States, as well as the central state of Texas.
