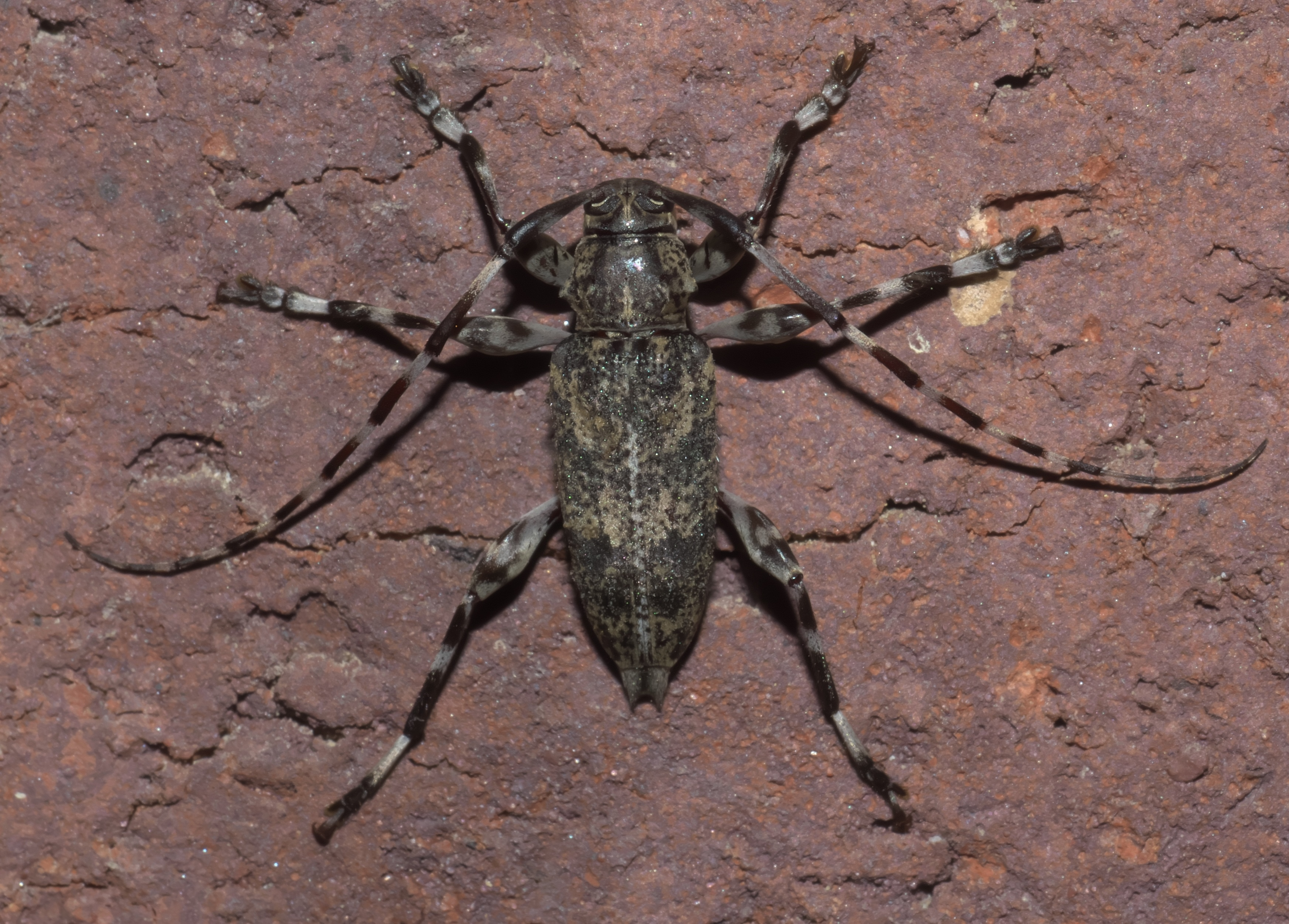

Scientific classification
- Kingdom: Animalia
- Phylum: Arthropoda
- Class: Insecta
- Order: Coleoptera
- Suborder: Polyphaga
- Infraorder: Cucujiformia
- Family: Cerambycidae
- Genus: Graphisurus
- Species: G. fasciatus

Binomial name
- Graphisurus fasciatus (Degeer, 1775)

= Graphisurus fasciatus =

Species of beetle

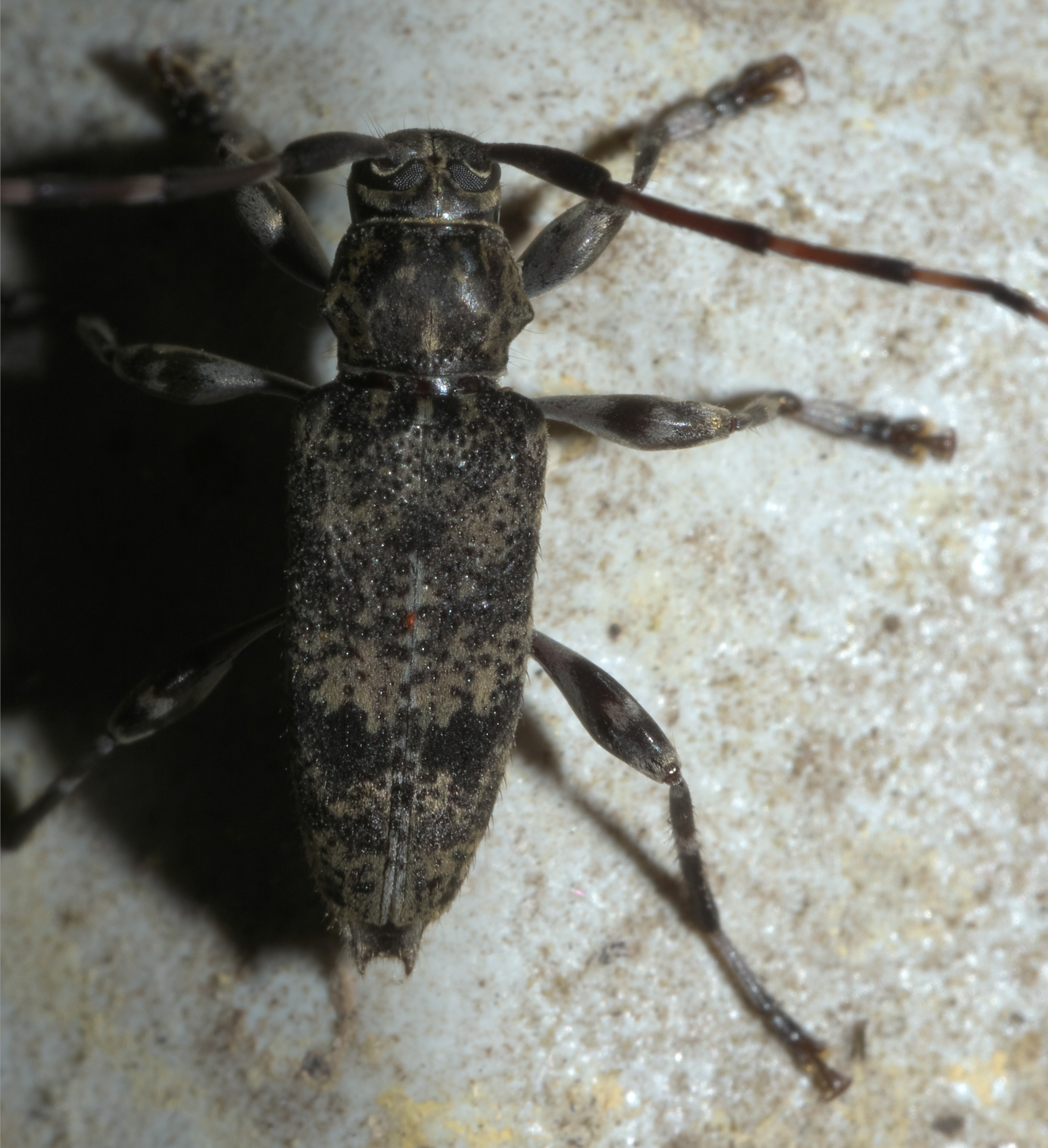
Graphisurus fasciatus, male, size: 10.2 mm

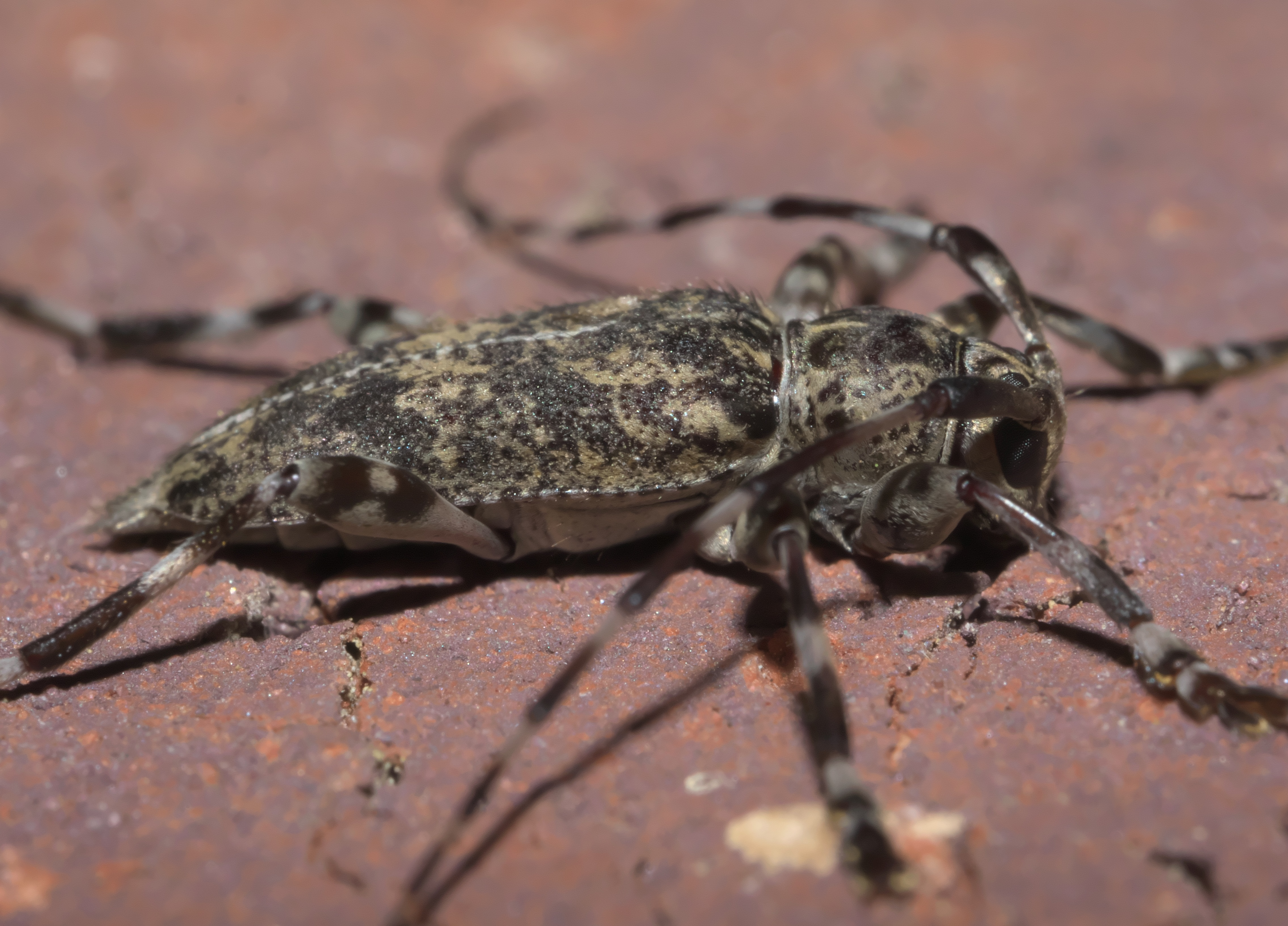
Graphisurus fasciatus, size: 12.6 mm

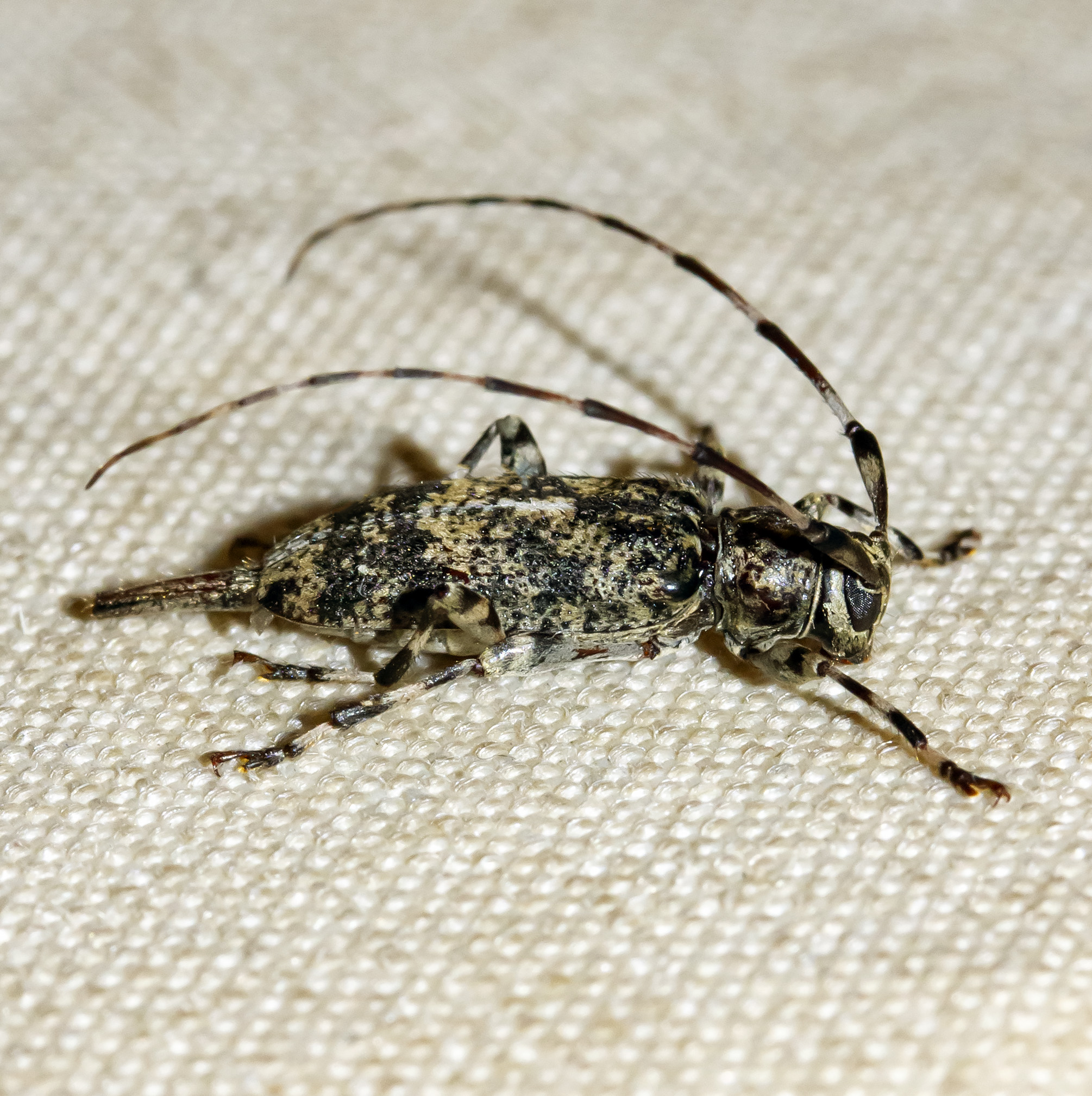
Flat-faced longhorn beetle female with ovipositor

Graphisurus fasciatus is a species of longhorn beetles of the subfamily Lamiinae. It was described by Degeer in 1775, and is known from eastern North America.
