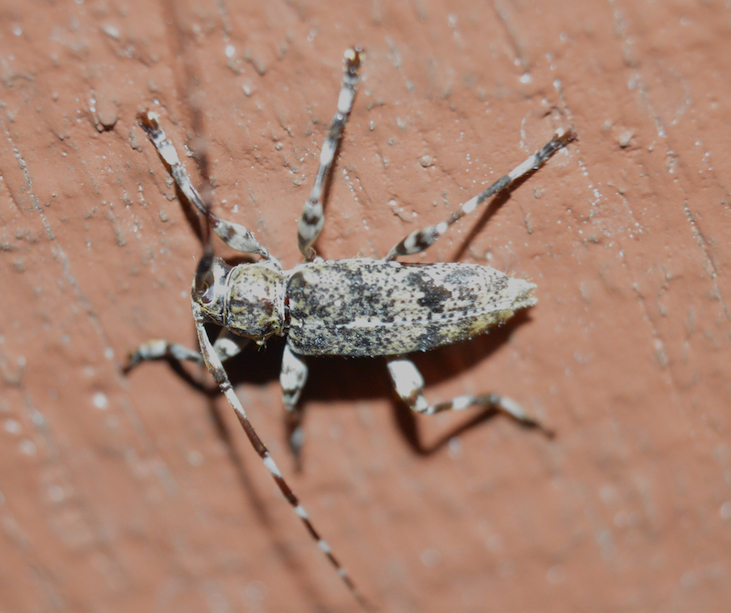
- Graphisurus sp.

Scientific classification
- Kingdom: Animalia
- Phylum: Arthropoda
- Class: Insecta
- Order: Coleoptera
- Suborder: Polyphaga
- Infraorder: Cucujiformia
- Family: Cerambycidae
- Tribe: Acanthocinini
- Genus: Graphisurus; Kirby, 1837

Synonyms
- Urographis Horn, 1880

= Graphisurus =

Genus of beetles

Graphisurus is a genus of beetles in the family Cerambycidae, containing the following species:

- Graphisurus despectus (LeConte in Agassiz, 1850)
- Graphisurus eucharis (Bates, 1885)
- Graphisurus fasciatus (Degeer, 1775)
- Graphisurus triangulifer (Haldeman, 1847)
- Graphisurus vexillaris (Bates, 1872)
