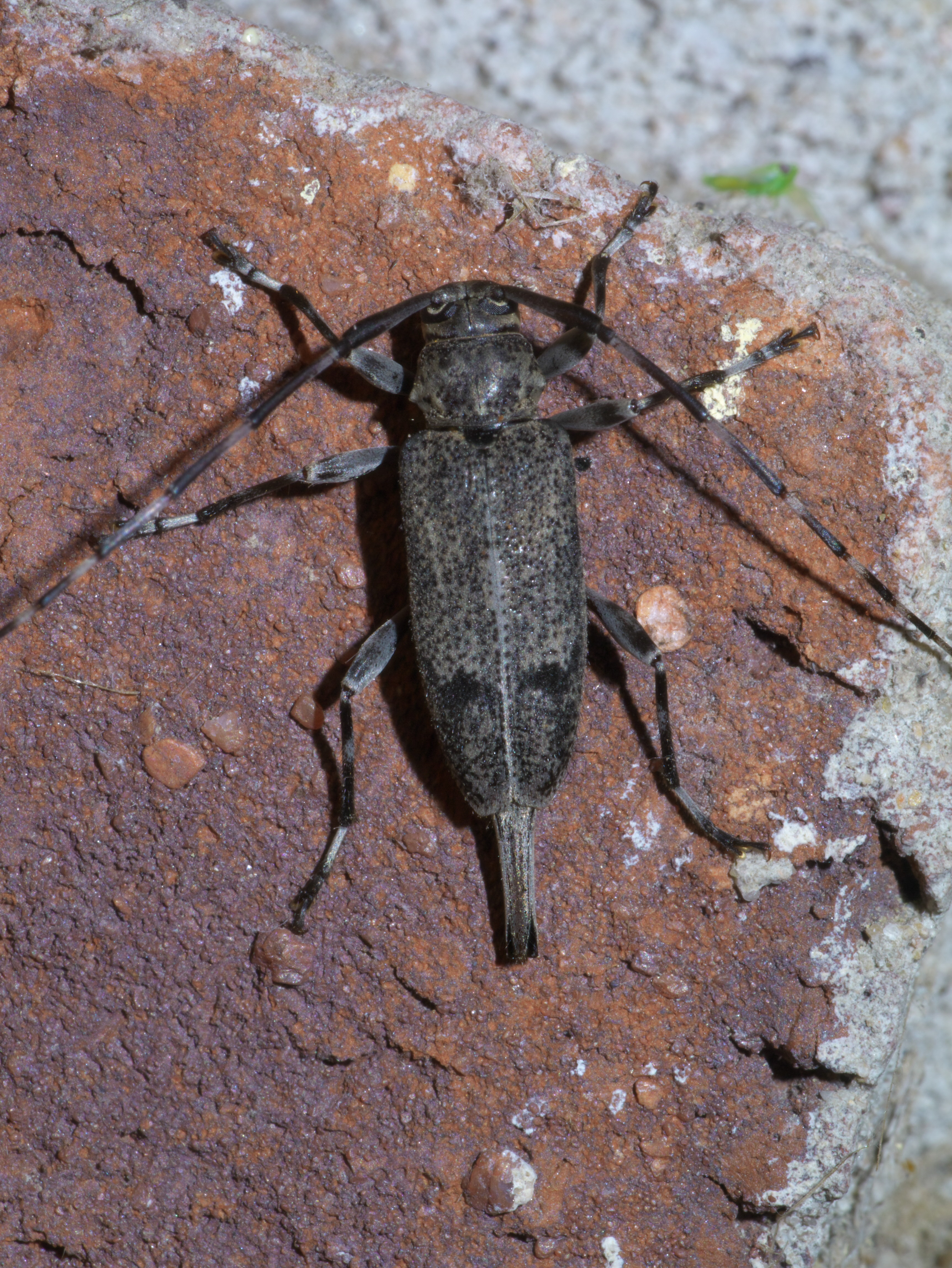

Scientific classification
- Kingdom: Animalia
- Phylum: Arthropoda
- Class: Insecta
- Order: Coleoptera
- Suborder: Polyphaga
- Infraorder: Cucujiformia
- Family: Cerambycidae
- Genus: Graphisurus
- Species: G. despectus

Binomial name
- Graphisurus despectus (LeConte in Agassiz, 1850)

= Graphisurus despectus =

Species of beetle

Graphisurus despectus is a species of longhorn beetles of the subfamily Lamiinae. It was described by John Lawrence LeConte in 1850, and is known from the eastern United States.
