= List of longhorn beetle species recorded in Great Britain =

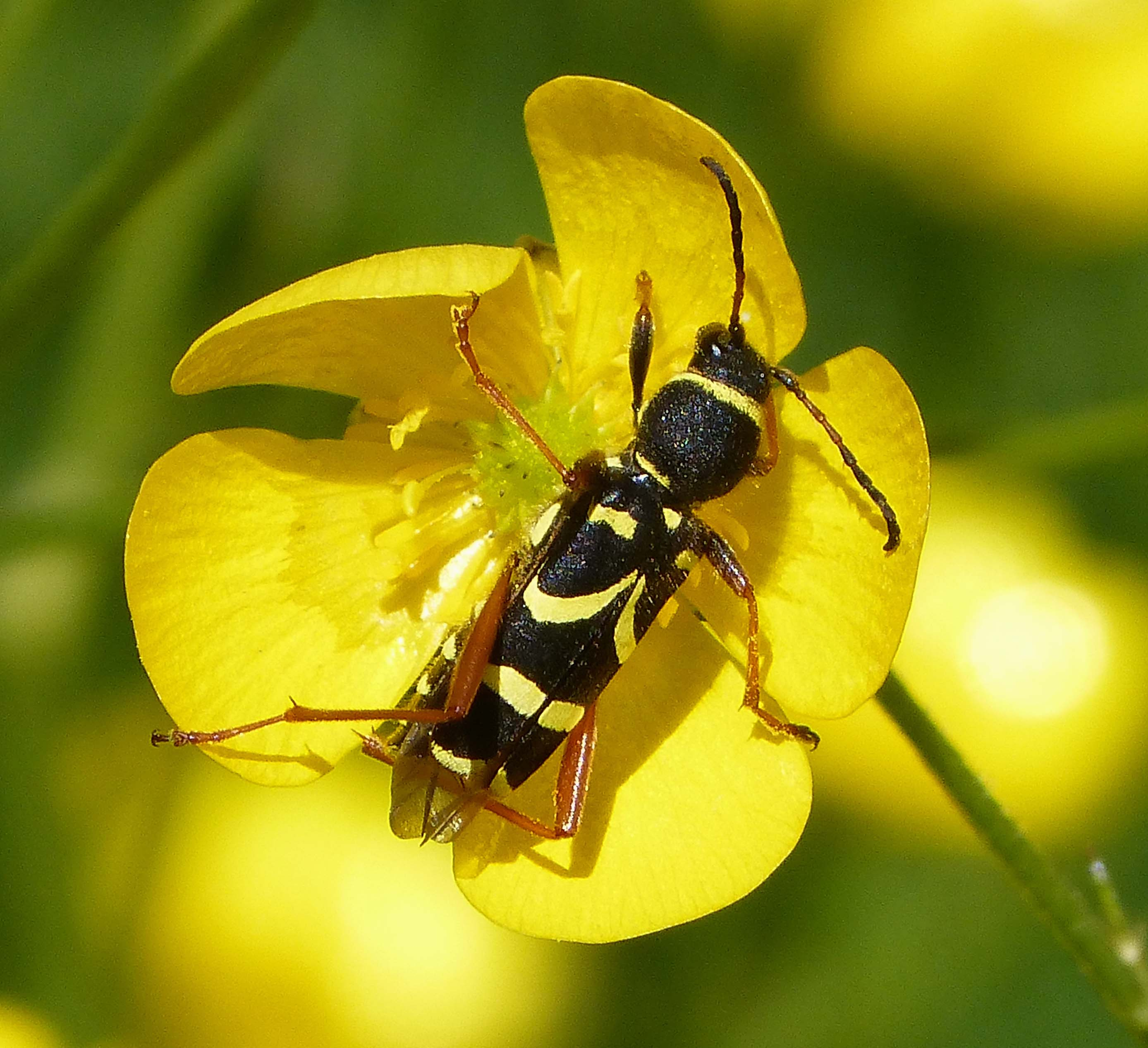
This wasp-mimicking beetle, Clytus arietis, is common through England and Wales.

There are fifty-nine species of longhorn beetle native to Great Britain. Longhorn beetles (family Cerambycidae) are found on every continent in the world except Antarctica, and are among the most diverse and important beetle families. Around 35,000 species are known. A few of the British species are known from accidental introductions, while a handful are now believed to be extirpated from the island. Longhorn beetles are found in the vast majority of Britain, excepting some remote parts of Scotland, but enjoy their greatest diversity in southern England, especially in some of the Home Counties, in Hampshire, and in Cambridgeshire. In Scotland, they are more diverse and more frequently recorded in the Highlands than in the Lowlands.

== List of native species ==
There are fifty-nine native species of longhorn beetle in Great Britain, in five subfamilies.

=== Subfamily Cerambycinae ===
Subfamily Cerambycinae
Species	Image	Distribution	Distribution in Britain
Anaglyptus mysticus (Linnaeus, 1758) Rufous-shouldered longhorn beetle	A red and black beetle with white markings	Europe and Asia minor	Patchy distribution in England
Aromia moschata (Linnaeus, 1758) Musk beetle	An iridescent green beetle	Palearctic realm	Patchy distribution in England
Callidium violaceum (Linnaeus, 1758)	A blue beetle with a rectangular abdomen	Eurasia, from Europe through Caucasia and China to Japan	Found in England; recorded more in the Midlands and points southward.
Clytus arietis (Linnaeus, 1758) Wasp beetle	A black beetle with wasp-like yellow stripes and legs	Europe and western Asia	Common in England
Gracilia minuta (Fabricius, 1781) Basket beetle	A brown beetle with an abdomen that tapers anteriorly	Western Palearctic realm	England; a few records in Wales and Scotland
Hylotrupes bajulus (Linnaeus, 1758) Old house borer	A brown beetle with a pair of white markings	Originally from Europe, but now with a cosmopolitan distribution	Southern England, with some records from the Midlands and Wales
Molorchus minor (Linnaeus, 1758) Spruce shortwing beetle	A slender red-brown beetle with extremely long antennae	Eurasia, from Korea and China through Mongolia and Iran to Europe, Turkey, and Russia	Scattered distribution through southern England, the Midlands, central Wales, and near Middlesbrough.
Molorchus umbellatarum (Schreber, 1759) Pear shortwing beetle	A red and brown beetle	Europe and western Asia	Southern England and southeast Wales
Nathrius brevipennis (Mulsant, 1839)	A slender red and brown beetle	Western Palearctic realm: Europe and North Africa to central Asia	Scattered records through England
Obrium brunneum (Fabricius, 1793) Brown longhorn beetle		Europe, Turkey, and Caucasia	Southeast England only
Plagionotus arcuatus (Linnaeus, 1758)	A black beetle with wasp-like yellow stripes and legs	Western Palearctic realm: Europe and North Africa to Caucasia and Iran	Scattered English records in Yorkshire and southwards, excluding the South West Peninsula
Poecilium alni (Linnaeus, 1767) White-banded longhorn beetle	A small dark beetle with yellow legs	Europe and western–central Asia	Scarce; found in some woodlands in South East England
Pyrrhidium sanguineum (Linnaeus, 1758) Welsh oak longhorn beetle	A ruby-red beetle with black legs	Common in central Europe; found around the Palearctic realm in Iran and westwards	Found in southeastern Wales and patchily distributed elsewhere in Wales and in England's Midlands and southern regions.

=== Subfamily Lamiinae ===
Species	Image	Distribution	Distribution in Britain
Acanthocinus aedilis (Linnaeus, 1758) Timberman beetle	A grey beetle with long, striped antennae	Northern Eurasia and all of Europe	Most common in the Scottish Highlands; scattered records elsewhere.
Agapanthia villosoviridescens (De Geer, 1775) Golden-bloomed grey longhorn beetle	A beetle with a mottled yellow-black abdomen	Europe, Kazakhstan, Caucasia, and the Near East	Central and southern England, but not in South West England
Lamia textor (Linnaeus, 1758) Weaver beetle	A robust, dark beetle	Eurasia: from Europe through Turkey and Central Asia to Japan and Taiwan	Scattered records across Britain, possibly now restricted to Cambridgeshire
Leiopus nebulosus (Linnaeus, 1758) Black-clouded longhorn beetle	A mottled grey-buff-black beetle	Europe, Russia, and the Near East	In Wales, and in England but far less common in the North and in Cornwall; a few records in Scotland
Mesosa nebulosa (Fabricius, 1781) White-clouded longhorn beetle	A brown beetle with yellow and orange patches	Europe and the Mediterranean area	Southern England
Oberea oculata (Linnaeus, 1758)	A long, slender beetle with black wing-cases and bright orange thorax and legs	Palearctic realm	Wetlands: uncommon, but most-reported in East Anglia
Phytoecia cylindrica (Linnaeus, 1758) Umbellifer longhorn beetle	A long, black, slender beetle with a rectangular abdomen	Europe	Common in England south of the Humber
Pogonocherus fasciculatus (De Geer, 1775)		Europe, Kazakhstan, Caucasia, and the Near East	Scattered distribution from the Scottish Highlands to South East England
Pogonocherus hispidulus (Piller & Mitterpacher, 1783) Greater thorn-tipped longhorn beetle	A small brownish beetle with white shoulders	Common in Europe, Siberia, and Turkey and Caucasia	Common through most of England; patchy records from Scotland
Pogonocherus hispidus (Linnaeus, 1758) Lesser thorn-tipped longhorn beetle	A small orange and brown beetle	Western Palearctic realm: Europe, west Asia, and North Africa	Common through inland Wales, the Midlands, and the south of England except the South West Peninsula; scattered records in the north of England
Saperda carcharias (Linnaeus, 1758) Large poplar longhorn beetle	A brown beetle on a branch	Russia; from Mongolia west to Europe	East Anglia and Lincolnshire to Yorkshire; a few records in the Scottish Highlands
Saperda populnea (Linnaeus, 1758) Small poplar borer	A black beetle with many yellow lines and splotches	Western Palearctic realm: North Africa, Europe, Anatolia, Russia, and Kazakhstan	Patchy distribution mainly in England, especially southwards
Saperda scalaris (Linnaeus, 1758) Ladder-marked longhorn beetle	A black beetle ornately marked with thick chartreuse lines, dots, and curves	Europe through central Asia to China and Korea	Uncommon; scattered distribution from the English Midlands to Scotland
Stenostola dubia (Laicharting, 1784) Lime longhorn beetle	A long black beetle	Europe	Patchy distribution: in the southeast of England and in a broad diagonal swathe from Cornwall to County Durham, including the innermost part of Wales.
Tetrops praeustus (Linnaeus, 1758) Plum longhorn beetle	A beetle with a large orange area covering most of the abdomen	Found in most of the western Palearctic realm: Europe, Russia, western Asia, and Algeria	Common through England in Yorkshire through to Dorset, excepting the South West Peninsula and Lancashire
Tetrops starkii Chevrolat, 1859	A beetle with a large hairy orange area covering most of the abdomen	Europe, Turkey, and Azerbaijan	Scattered records in southern England

=== Subfamily Lepturinae ===
Subfamily Lepturinae
Species	Image	Distribution	Distribution in Britain
Alosterna tabacicolor (De Geer, 1775) Tobacco-coloured longhorn beetle	A slender beetle with brownish-orange wingcases	Eurasia from Kazakhstan westwards, excluding the Levant	Common in England south of the Humber; patchy distribution from there through to Scotland
Anastrangalia sanguinolenta (Linnaeus, 1761) Blood-red longhorn beetle	A beetle with striking, dark red wingcases	Eurasia from West Siberia westwards, excluding the Levant	Rare species found only in the Scottish Highlands.
Anoplodera sexguttata (Fabricius, 1775) Six-spotted longhorn beetle	A dark beetle with six golden spots on its wing-cases	Europe, Turkey, and Algeria	Rare species with patchy distribution in England
Dinoptera collaris (Linnaeus, 1758)	A slender, shiny black beetle with deep red thorax	Europe and western Asia, including Caucasia.	Patchy distribution in south east England and the Midlands.
Grammoptera abdominalis (Stephens, 1831) Black grammoptera	A black beetle with yellow legs and antennae	Europe, but not the North nor any of Caucasia	Scarce and found only patchily in south east England and the Midlands
Grammoptera ruficornis (Fabricius, 1781) Common grammoptera	A dark, slender beetle with yellow legs and antennae	Europe and western Asia, including Russia and Caucasia	Common in England and Wales; patchy records from Scotland
Grammoptera ustulata (Schaller, 1783) Burnt-tip grammoptera	A small ochre-coloured beetle on a leaf	Europe and western Asia, including Caucasia	A rare species found only sparsely in southern England, the Midlands, and parts of Wales
Judolia sexmaculata (Linnaeus, 1758)	A black beetle with large golden markings on its wing-cases	Europe, in select coniferous forests	Recorded from the Scottish Highlands only
Leptura aurulenta Fabricius, 1793 Golden-haired longhorn beetle	A black beetle with four pairs of large, pale yellow patches on its wing-cases	North Africa and Turkey to Europe, excluding the North	Scarce and patchily distributed south of the Midlands
Leptura quadrifasciata Linnaeus, 1758 Four-banded longhorn beetle	A black beetle with four thick, wavy, pale yellow bands on its wing-cases	Europe and western Asia, including Caucasia	Found in most of England and Scotland and throughout Wales
Pachytodes cerambyciformis (Schrank, 1781)	An orange and black beetle with a relatively wide abdomen and slender thorax and head.	Caucasia through Turkey to Europe; absent from northern Europe	In Wales, neighbouring English regions, and the South West Peninsula; also found in southern England, with scattered records from the North and in Scotland
Paracorymbia fulva (De Geer, 1775)	A black beetle with fulvous wing-cases	Mainly southern and western Europe; also found in Russia and Anatolia	Records are concentrated in southern Hampshire, parts of the South West Peninsula, and northeastern Norfolk, with isolated records from the Midlands and the Home Counties.
Pedostrangalia revestita (Linnaeus, 1767)	A ruddy beetle with solid black wing-cases	Europe and Turkey	South East England and East Anglia only
Phymatodes testaceus (Linnaeus, 1758)	A reddish beetle with brown wing-cases	From North Africa, around the through Israel and Iran to Turkey and Europe	Common through England south of the Humber
Pseudovadonia livida (Fabricius, 1777) Fairy-ring longhorn beetle	A black beetle with golden-brown wing-cases sitting on flowers	Europe and western Asia.	Common in parts of southern England and the Midlands
Rhagium bifasciatum Fabricius, 1775 Two-banded longhorn beetle	A slender black beetle with white and red markings on its thorax	Europe, and western Asia	Common throughout Great Britain, excepting only parts of Scotland
Rhagium inquisitor (Linnaeus, 1758) Ribbed pine borer	A mottled beige, grey, black, and brown beetle	Western Palearctic realm: Europe, parts of North Africa, and western Asia	Scarce and found only in the Scottish Highlands
Rhagium mordax (De Geer, 1775) Black-spotted longhorn beetle	A mottled brown and black beetle	Europe, Russia, and Caucasia	Common throughout Great Britain, excepting only parts of Scotland
Rutpela maculata (Poda, 1761) Black-and-yellow longhorn beetle	A long, slender black beetle with huge yellow spots that nearly cover its wing-cases	Europe and western Asia	Common through England except in the Pennines and in far southern Scotland
Stenocorus meridianus (Linnaeus, 1758) Variable longhorn beetle	A slender, fulvous-brown beetle	Europe, western and central Asia, and Siberia	Common in England, especially in the South and the Midlands
Stenurella melanura (Linnaeus, 1758) Black-striped longhorn beetle	A dull black beetle with two fulvous stripes on the lateral margins of its wing-cases	Europe and western Asia	Common through southern England and most of the Midlands
Stenurella nigra (Linnaeus, 1758)	A small, shiny, black beetle	Europe and western Asia	A Rare species with scattered records through southern England and most of the Midlands
Stictoleptura rubra (Linnaeus, 1758) Red longhorn beetle	A pair of small, slender beetles, the first pale brown on its wing-cases and the second darker and more orange	Found in Europe, North Africa, and Russia	Patchy distribution in East Anglia and elsewhere south of the Humber, including south Wales
Stictoleptura scutellata (Fabricius, 1781) Large black longhorn beetle	A stocky, black beetle	Palearctic realm from North Iran and westwards; absent from northern Europe	A rare species with patchy distribution around London and a few other areas in England south of the Humber
Strangalia attenuata (Linnaeus, 1758)	A narrow, pointy-ended black beetle with wing-cases covered with large golden spots	Found from Japan, Korea, and the Russian Far East through Siberia and central Asia to Europe, Caucasia, and Iran	Reported only in far southern England

=== Subfamily Prioninae ===
Subfamily Prioninae
Species	Image	Distribution	Distribution in Britain
Prionus coriarius (Linnaeus, 1758) Tanner beetle	A large, stocky, shiny, black beetle	Found in forested parts of the Palearctic realm in Iran and westwards.	Scarce in Great Britain: sparsely distributed in southern England and in south Wales.

=== Subfamily Spondylidinae ===
Subfamily Spondylidinae
Species	Image	Distribution	Distribution in Britain
Arhopalus ferus (Mulsant, 1839) Burnt pine longhorn beetle	A rounded beetle with a soft-brown body and ruddy marks on its wing-cases.	Europe, North Africa, Russia, Kazakhstan, and the Near East.	Patchy distribution in England; more commonly reported from the south
Arhopalus rusticus (Linnaeus, 1758)	A beetle with grooved, dirty orange-brown abdomen.	Eurasia: Europe to China, including Mongolia and Iran; northwestern Africa	England in Yorkshire and southwards, Wales, and the Scottish Highlands
Asemum striatum (Linnaeus, 1758) Pine-stump borer	A dark beetle with many grooves on its wing-cases.	Holoarctic realm: Eurasia and North America	Patchy distribution across Great Britain; absent from the South West Peninsula
Tetropium gabrieli Weise, 1905 Larch longhorn	A dark beetle with rectangular shoulders and orange legs	Europe	Wales, except the southwest; England, but barely in the South West Peninsula; a few records from Highland Scotland

== Introduced species ==
There are a few introduced species of longhorn beetle present in Britain.

Introduced species
Species	Image	Distribution	Distribution in Britain
Agapanthia cardui (Linnaeus, 1767)	A grey beetle with long striped antennae standing on a branch.	Europe, Egypt, Turkey, and Kazakhstan	Common in east Kent; there is also one isolated record from Wales
Stictoleptura cordigera (Fuessly, 1775) Heart longhorn beetle	A long-legged beetle with symmetrical, rich red markings on a black field.	Europe except for the North; Turkey and western Asia; and Libya	London and Essex: multiple records from London's Queen Elizabeth Olympic Park and area, but no farther west from that; found as far east as Thurrock, Essex
Tetropium castaneum (Linnaeus 1758) Black spruce longhorn beetle	A beetle with a black head and thorax and yellow-brown abdomen and legs.	Found in forested parts of the north Palearctic realm	Patchily introduced with scattered records from Scotland south to England, not south of London. Believed to be now naturalised.

== See also ==
- List of leaf beetle (Chrysomelidae) species recorded in Britain
- List of beetle species recorded in Britain
