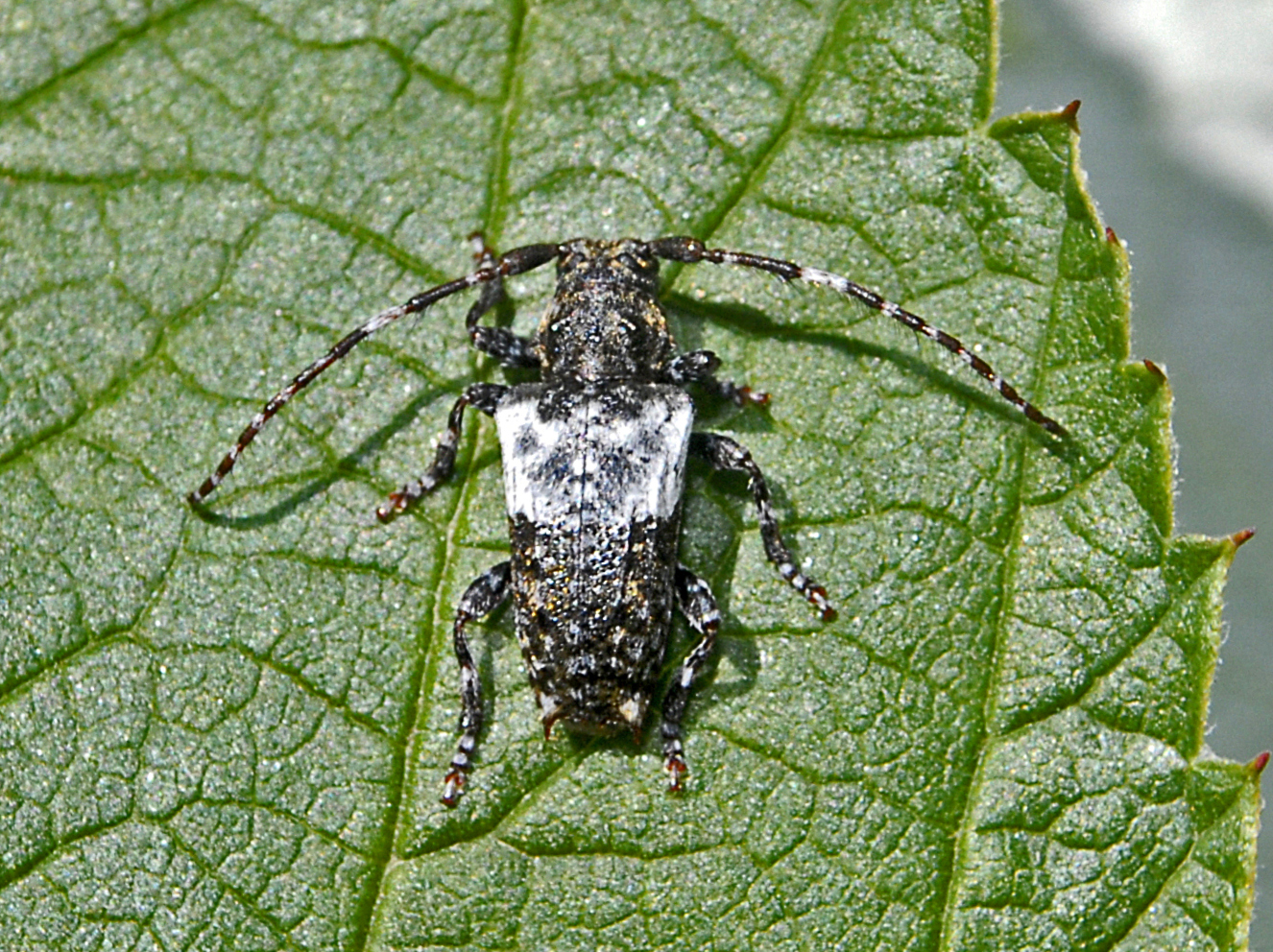
- Pogonocherus hispidulus

Scientific classification
- Kingdom: Animalia
- Phylum: Arthropoda
- Class: Insecta
- Order: Coleoptera
- Suborder: Polyphaga
- Infraorder: Cucujiformia
- Family: Cerambycidae
- Subfamily: Lamiinae
- Tribe: Pogonocherini
- Genus: Pogonocherus; Dejean, 1821

Synonyms
- Eupogonocherus Linsley, 1935; Pogonochaerus Gemminger & Harold, 1873

= Pogonocherus =

Genus of beetles

Pogonocherus is a genus of flat-faced longhorn beetles in the family Cerambycidae.

== Species ==
- Pogonocherus decoratus Fairmaire, 1855
- Pogonocherus fasciculatus (De Geer, 1775)
- Pogonocherus inermicollis Reitter, 1894
- Pogonocherus jaekeli Zang, 1905 †
- Pogonocherus ovatoides Rapuzzi & Sama, 2014
- Pogonocherus ovatus (Goeze, 1777)
- Pogonocherus penicillatus Le Conte in Agassiz, 1850
- Pogonocherus propinquus Fall, 1910
- Pogonocherus ressli Holzschuh, 1977
- Pogonocherus anatolicus Daniel, 1898
- Pogonocherus arizonicus Schäffer, 1908
- Pogonocherus caroli Mulsant, 1863
- Pogonocherus cedri Peyerimhoff, 1916
- Pogonocherus creticus Kratochvil, 1985
- Pogonocherus dimidiatus Blessig, 1873
- Pogonocherus eugeniae Ganglbauer, 1891
- Pogonocherus hispidulus (Piller & Mitterpacher, 1783) - greater thorn-tipped longhorn beetle
- Pogonocherus hispidus (Linnaeus, 1758)
- Pogonocherus marcoi Sama, 1993 inq.
- Pogonocherus mixtus Haldeman, 1847
- Pogonocherus neuhausi Müller, 1916
- Pogonocherus parvulus LeConte, 1852
- Pogonocherus perroudi Mulsant, 1839
- Pogonocherus pictus Fall, 1910
- Pogonocherus pilosipes Pic, 1907
- Pogonocherus plasoni (Ganglbauer, 1884)
- Pogonocherus sieversi (Ganglbauer, 1886)
- Pogonocherus sturanii Sama & Schurmann, 1982
- Pogonocherus ehdenensis Sama & Rapuzzi, 2000
- Pogonocherus pesarinii Sama, 1993
