= Pogonocherus inermicollis =

Scientific classification
- Kingdom: Animalia
- Phylum: Arthropoda
- Class: Insecta
- Order: Coleoptera
- Suborder: Polyphaga
- Infraorder: Cucujiformia
- Family: Cerambycidae
- Genus: Pogonocherus
- Species: P. inermicollis

Binomial name
- Pogonocherus inermicollis Reitter, 1894

Species of beetle

Pogonocherus inermicollis is a species of beetle in the family Cerambycidae. It was described by Edmund Reitter in 1894. It is known from the Caucasus Mountains.
