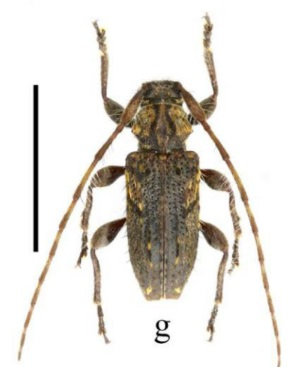

Scientific classification
- Kingdom: Animalia
- Phylum: Arthropoda
- Class: Insecta
- Order: Coleoptera
- Suborder: Polyphaga
- Infraorder: Cucujiformia
- Family: Cerambycidae
- Genus: Trichorondonia
- Species: T. wenkaii

Binomial name
- Trichorondonia wenkaii Yang, Huang & Xie, 2025

= Trichorondonia wenkaii =

Species of beetle

Trichorondonia wenkaii is a species of beetle of the family Cerambycidae. It is found in China (Guangxi).

== Description ==
Adults reach a length of about 6.7 mm. They have a blackish-brown body, clothed with greyish-yellow and black hairs, as well as greyish-white and black setae forming distinct patterns.

== Etymology ==
The species is named after Professor Wang Wenkai, a cerambycid taxonomist and the mentor of the corresponding author.
