= Pogonocherus anatolicus =

Scientific classification
- Domain: Eukaryota
- Kingdom: Animalia
- Phylum: Arthropoda
- Class: Insecta
- Order: Coleoptera
- Suborder: Polyphaga
- Infraorder: Cucujiformia
- Family: Cerambycidae
- Tribe: Pogonocherini
- Genus: Pogonocherus
- Species: P. anatolicus

Binomial name
- Pogonocherus anatolicus Daniel, 1898

Species of beetle

Pogonocherus anatolicus is a species of beetle in the family Cerambycidae. It was described by Daniel in 1898. It is known from Syria, Cyprus, and Turkey.
