= Pogonocherus dimidiatus =

Scientific classification
- Domain: Eukaryota
- Kingdom: Animalia
- Phylum: Arthropoda
- Class: Insecta
- Order: Coleoptera
- Suborder: Polyphaga
- Infraorder: Cucujiformia
- Family: Cerambycidae
- Tribe: Pogonocherini
- Genus: Pogonocherus
- Species: P. dimidiatus

Binomial name
- Pogonocherus dimidiatus Blessig, 1873

Synonyms
- Eupogonocherus seminiveus (Bates, 1873); Pogonocherus seminiveus Bates, 1873; Pogonocherus tristiculus Kraatz, 1879

Species of beetle

Pogonocherus dimidiatus is a species of beetle in the family Cerambycidae. It was described by Blessig in 1873. It is known from Russia, China, North Korea, South Korea, and Japan.
