= Trichorondonia =

Scientific classification
- Kingdom: Animalia
- Phylum: Arthropoda
- Class: Insecta
- Order: Coleoptera
- Suborder: Polyphaga
- Infraorder: Cucujiformia
- Family: Cerambycidae
- Subfamily: Lamiinae
- Tribe: Acanthocinini
- Genus: Trichorondonia; Breuning, 1965

Synonyms
- Pogonocherus (Neopogonocherus) Lazarev, 2021

Genus of beetles

Trichorondonia is a genus of beetles of the family Cerambycidae.

== Species list ==
- Trichorondonia hybolasioides Breuning, 1965
- Trichorondonia kabateki Viktora, 2024
- Trichorondonia pilosipes (Pic, 1907)
- Trichorondonia wenkaii Yang, Huang & Xie, 2025
