= Pogonocherus ehdenensis =

Scientific classification
- Domain: Eukaryota
- Kingdom: Animalia
- Phylum: Arthropoda
- Class: Insecta
- Order: Coleoptera
- Suborder: Polyphaga
- Infraorder: Cucujiformia
- Family: Cerambycidae
- Tribe: Pogonocherini
- Genus: Pogonocherus
- Species: P. ehdenensis

Binomial name
- Pogonocherus ehdenensis Sama & Rapuzzi, 2000

Species of beetle

Pogonocherus ehdenensis is a species of beetle in the family Cerambycidae. It was described by Sama and Rapuzzi in 2000. It is known from Lebanon.
