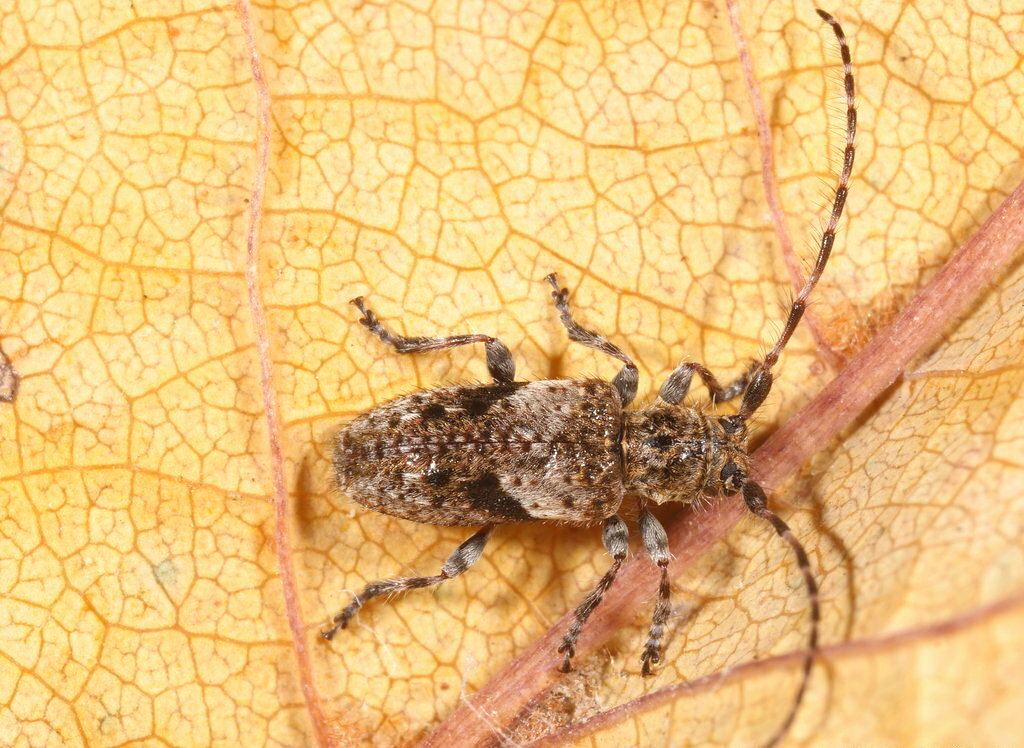

Scientific classification
- Domain: Eukaryota
- Kingdom: Animalia
- Phylum: Arthropoda
- Class: Insecta
- Order: Coleoptera
- Suborder: Polyphaga
- Infraorder: Cucujiformia
- Family: Cerambycidae
- Tribe: Pogonocherini
- Genus: Pogonocherus
- Species: P. decoratus

Binomial name
- Pogonocherus decoratus Fairmaire, 1855

Synonyms
- Pogonocherus ovalis (Gyllenhaal) Godron, 1886; Pogonocherus ovalis (Gmelin) Gyllenhaal, 1827; Pogonocherus ovatus (Goeze) Jensen-Haarup, 1914

= Pogonocherus decoratus =

Species of beetle

Pogonocherus decoratus is a species of beetle in the family Cerambycidae. It was described by Léon Fairmaire in 1855. It has a very wide distribution throughout Europe. It measures between 4 and 6 mm (0.16 and 0.24 in). It feeds on Pinus sylvestris.
