= Pogonocherus penicillatus =

Scientific classification
- Domain: Eukaryota
- Kingdom: Animalia
- Phylum: Arthropoda
- Class: Insecta
- Order: Coleoptera
- Suborder: Polyphaga
- Infraorder: Cucujiformia
- Family: Cerambycidae
- Tribe: Pogonocherini
- Genus: Pogonocherus
- Species: P. penicillatus

Binomial name
- Pogonocherus penicillatus LeConte in Agassiz, 1850

Synonyms
- Pogonocherus alaskanus Schaeffer, 1909; Pogonocherus carinatus Casey, 1913; Poliaenus penicellatus Doane & al., 1936

Species of beetle

Pogonocherus penicillatus is a species of beetle in the family Cerambycidae. It was described by John Lawrence LeConte in Agassizz in 1850. It is known from Canada and the United States.
