= Pogonocherus pictus =

Scientific classification
- Domain: Eukaryota
- Kingdom: Animalia
- Phylum: Arthropoda
- Class: Insecta
- Order: Coleoptera
- Suborder: Polyphaga
- Infraorder: Cucujiformia
- Family: Cerambycidae
- Tribe: Pogonocherini
- Genus: Pogonocherus
- Species: P. pictus

Binomial name
- Pogonocherus pictus Fall, 1910

Synonyms
- Pogonocherus emarginatus Casey, 1913; Pogonocherus fastigiatus Casey, 1913

Species of beetle

Pogonocherus pictus is a species of beetle in the family Cerambycidae. It was described by Fall in 1910. It is known from Canada and the United States.
