= Pogonocherus sieversi =

Scientific classification
- Domain: Eukaryota
- Kingdom: Animalia
- Phylum: Arthropoda
- Class: Insecta
- Order: Coleoptera
- Suborder: Polyphaga
- Infraorder: Cucujiformia
- Family: Cerambycidae
- Tribe: Pogonocherini
- Genus: Pogonocherus
- Species: P. sieversi

Binomial name
- Pogonocherus sieversi (Ganglbauer, 1886)

Synonyms
- Pogonochaerus sieversi Ganglbauer, 1886; Pogonocherus caucasicus Ganglbauer, 1891; Pogonocherus kuksha Plavilstshikov, 1924

Species of beetle

Pogonocherus sieversi is a species of beetle in the family Cerambycidae. It was described by Ganglbauer in 1886. It is known from Georgia, Turkey, Armenia and Ukraine.
