= Pachytodes bottcheri =

Scientific classification
- Kingdom: Animalia
- Phylum: Arthropoda
- Class: Insecta
- Order: Coleoptera
- Suborder: Polyphaga
- Infraorder: Cucujiformia
- Family: Cerambycidae
- Genus: Pachytodes
- Species: P. bottcheri

Binomial name
- Pachytodes bottcheri Pic, 1911

Synonyms
- Leptura (Pachytodes) erratica Bottcheri Pic, 1911; Judolia orthotricha Plavilstshikov, 1936

Species of beetle

Pachytodes bottcheri is a species of beetle in the family Cerambycidae. It occurs in Asia (Siberia, Central Asia, Mongolia, China).

Pachytodes bottcheri measure 6.5–14 mm (0.26–0.55 in) in length.
