= Pogonocherus ressli =

Scientific classification
- Domain: Eukaryota
- Kingdom: Animalia
- Phylum: Arthropoda
- Class: Insecta
- Order: Coleoptera
- Suborder: Polyphaga
- Infraorder: Cucujiformia
- Family: Cerambycidae
- Tribe: Pogonocherini
- Genus: Pogonocherus
- Species: P. ressli

Binomial name
- Pogonocherus ressli Holzschuh, 1977

Species of beetle

Pogonocherus ressli is a species of beetle in the family Cerambycidae. It was described by Holzschuh in 1977. It is known from Iran and Azerbaijan.
