= Pogonocherus cedri =

Scientific classification
- Domain: Eukaryota
- Kingdom: Animalia
- Phylum: Arthropoda
- Class: Insecta
- Order: Coleoptera
- Suborder: Polyphaga
- Infraorder: Cucujiformia
- Family: Cerambycidae
- Tribe: Pogonocherini
- Genus: Pogonocherus
- Species: P. cedri

Binomial name
- Pogonocherus cedri Peyerimhoff, 1916

Species of beetle

Pogonocherus cedri is a species of beetle in the family Cerambycidae. It was described by Peyerimhoff in 1916. It is known from Algeria. It feeds on Cedrus atlantica and Abies numidica.
