= Pogonocherus marcoi =

Scientific classification
- Domain: Eukaryota
- Kingdom: Animalia
- Phylum: Arthropoda
- Class: Insecta
- Order: Coleoptera
- Suborder: Polyphaga
- Infraorder: Cucujiformia
- Family: Cerambycidae
- Tribe: Pogonocherini
- Genus: Pogonocherus
- Species: P. marcoi

Binomial name
- Pogonocherus marcoi Sama, 1993 inq.

Species of beetle

Pogonocherus marcoi is a species of beetle in the family Cerambycidae. It was described by Sama in 1993. It is known from Italy. It feeds on Pinus pinea.
