= Pogonocherus ovatoides =

Scientific classification
- Domain: Eukaryota
- Kingdom: Animalia
- Phylum: Arthropoda
- Class: Insecta
- Order: Coleoptera
- Suborder: Polyphaga
- Infraorder: Cucujiformia
- Family: Cerambycidae
- Tribe: Pogonocherini
- Genus: Pogonocherus
- Species: P. ovatoides

Binomial name
- Pogonocherus ovatoides Rapuzzi & Sama, 2014

Species of beetle

Pogonocherus ovatoides is a species of beetle in the family Cerambycidae. It was described by Rapuzzi and Sama in 2014.
