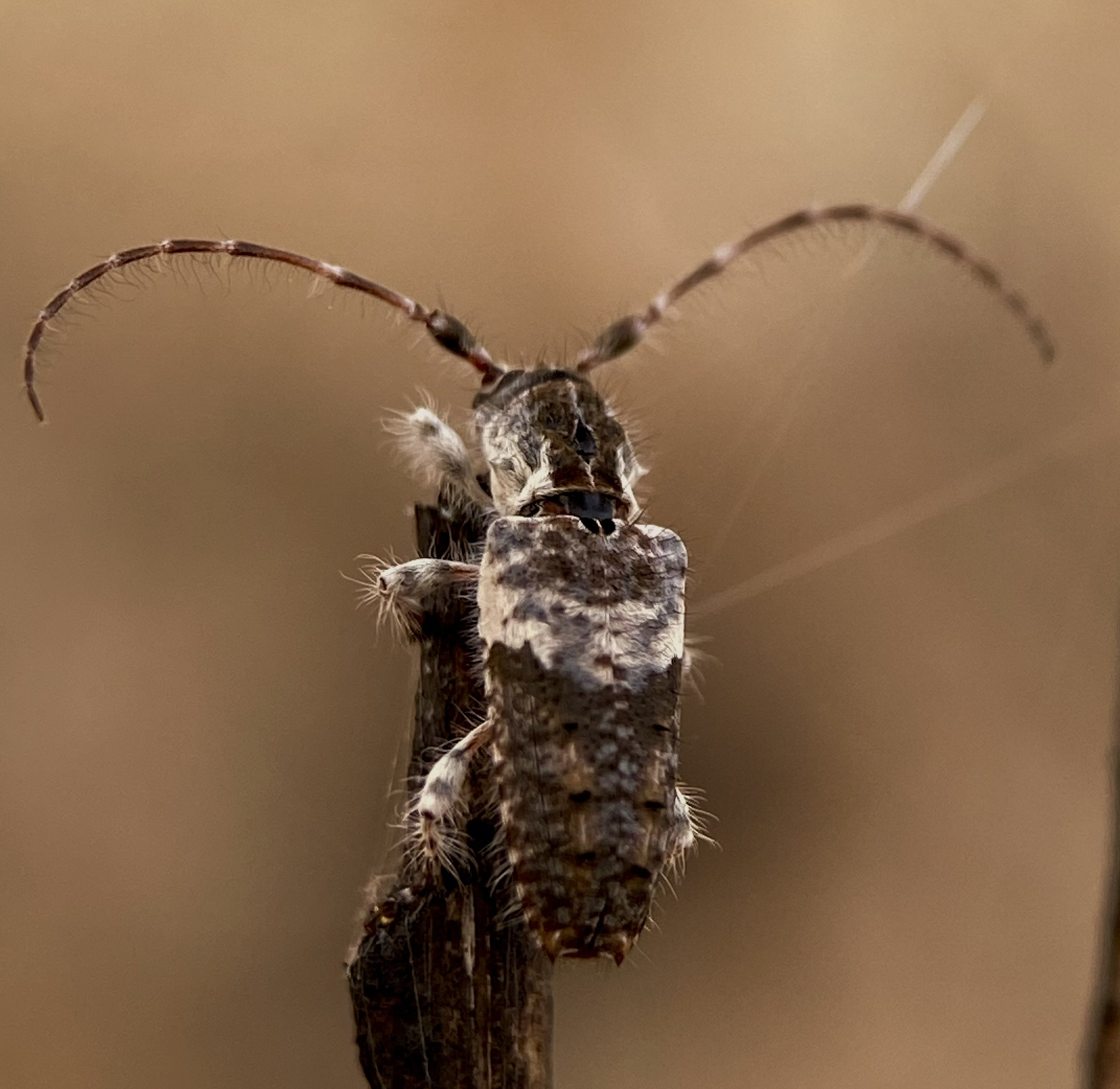

Scientific classification
- Kingdom: Animalia
- Phylum: Arthropoda
- Class: Insecta
- Order: Coleoptera
- Suborder: Polyphaga
- Infraorder: Cucujiformia
- Family: Cerambycidae
- Tribe: Pogonocherini
- Genus: Pogonocherus
- Species: P. perroudi

Binomial name
- Pogonocherus perroudi Mulsant, 1839

Synonyms
- Eupogonocherus perroudi (Mulsant) Villiers, 1978

= Pogonocherus perroudi =

Species of beetle

Pogonocherus perroudi is a species of beetle in the family Cerambycidae. It was described by Mulsant in 1839. It has a wide distribution between Europe and North Africa. It feeds on several species of Pinus.

== Subspecies ==
- Pogonocherus perroudi brevipilosus Holzschuh, 1993
- Pogonocherus perroudi perroudi Mulsant, 1839
