= Pogonocherus propinquus =

Scientific classification
- Domain: Eukaryota
- Kingdom: Animalia
- Phylum: Arthropoda
- Class: Insecta
- Order: Coleoptera
- Suborder: Polyphaga
- Infraorder: Cucujiformia
- Family: Cerambycidae
- Tribe: Pogonocherini
- Genus: Pogonocherus
- Species: P. propinquus

Binomial name
- Pogonocherus propinquus Fall, 1910

Species of beetle

Pogonocherus propinquus is a species of beetle in the family Cerambycidae. It was described by Fall in 1910. It is known from Canada and the United States.
