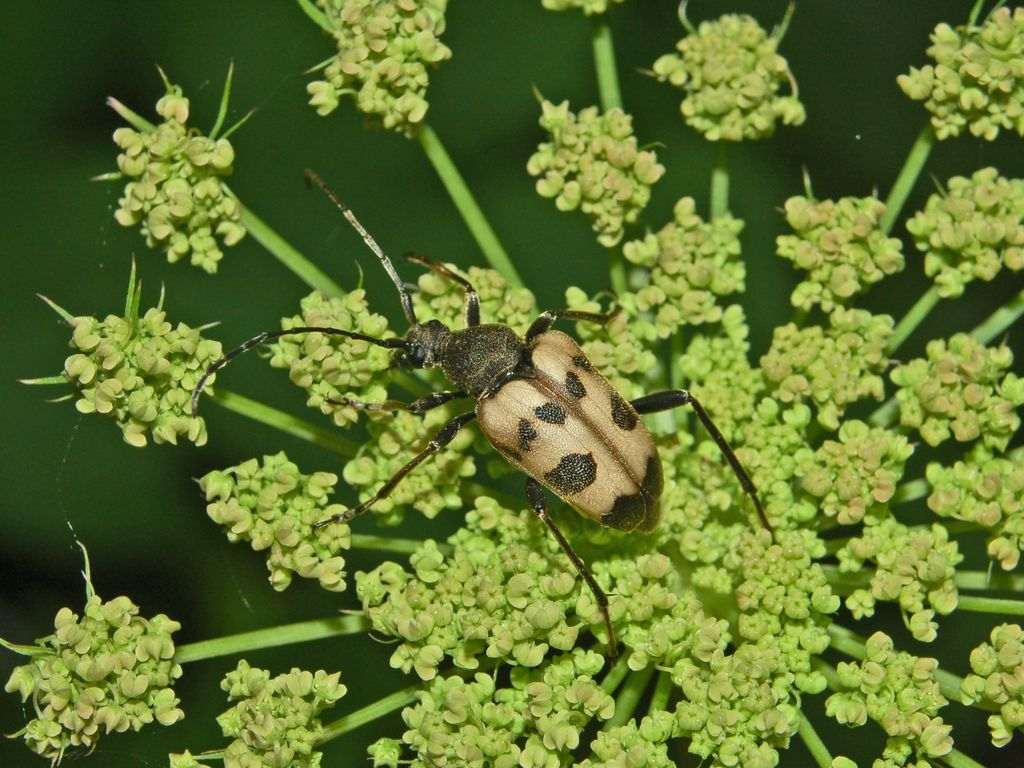
- Dorsal view
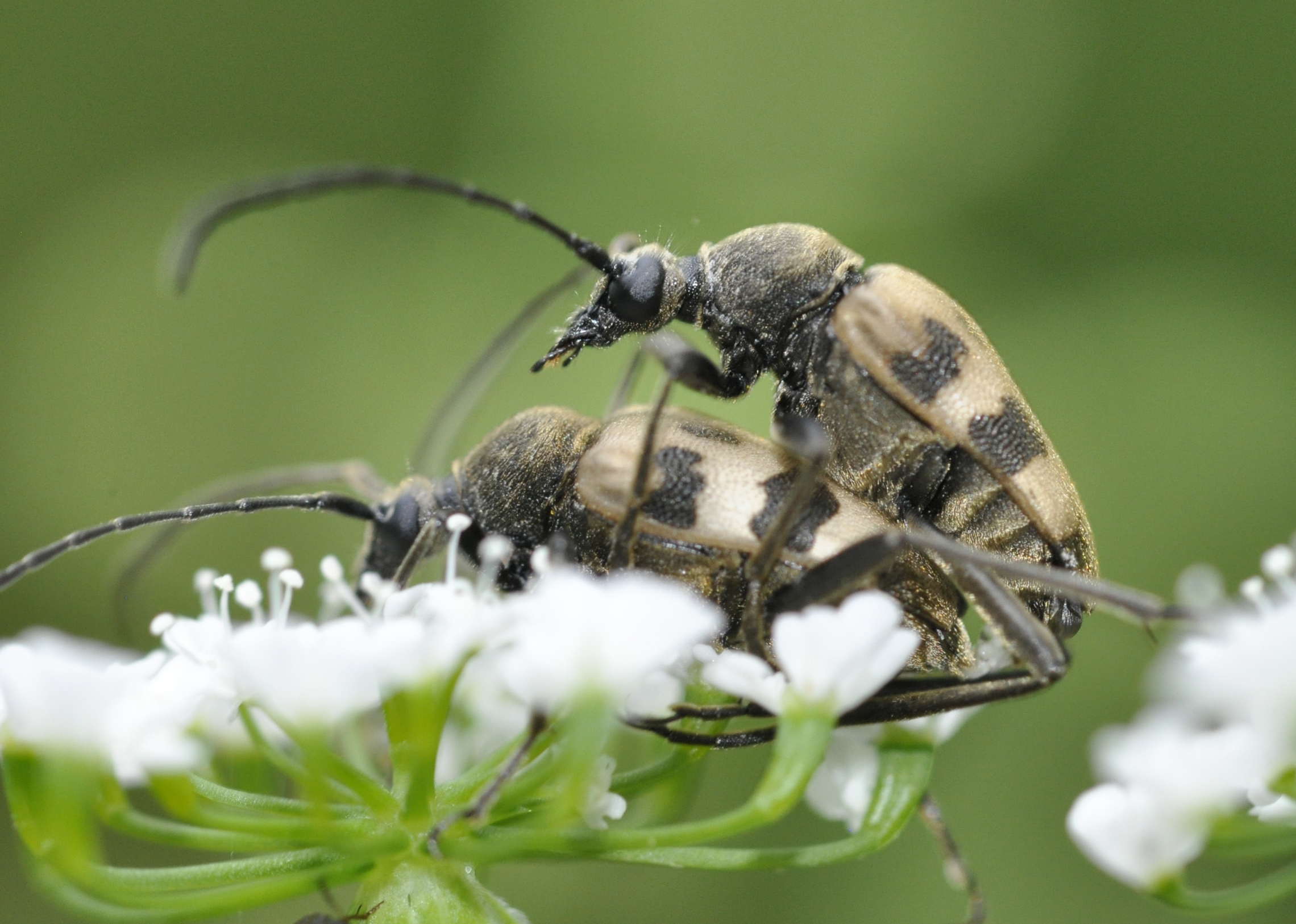
- Mating

Scientific classification
- Kingdom: Animalia
- Phylum: Arthropoda
- Clade: Pancrustacea
- Class: Insecta
- Order: Coleoptera
- Suborder: Polyphaga
- Infraorder: Cucujiformia
- Family: Cerambycidae
- Genus: Pachytodes
- Species: P. cerambyciformis

Binomial name
- Pachytodes cerambyciformis (Schrank, 1781)

Synonyms
- List: Judolia (Pachytodes) cerambyciformis (Schrank - Pic, 1891); Judolia cerambyciformis ab. zemplinensis (Podaný, 1979); Pachyta cerambyciformis (Schrank - Gemminger & Harold, 1872); Stenocorus parvapunctatus (Voet, 1806); Leptura cerambyciformis (Schrank, 1781)

= Pachytodes cerambyciformis =

Species of beetle

Pachytodes cerambyciformis is a species of beetle belonging to the family Cerambycidae, subfamily Lepturinae (flower longhorns).

== Description ==
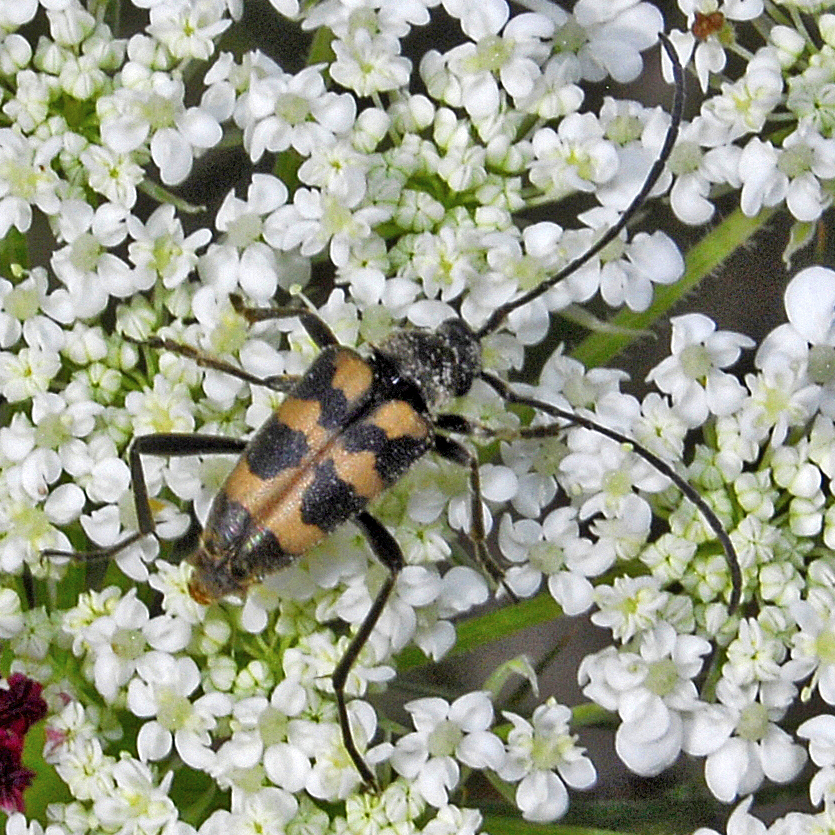
Pachytodes cerambyciformis

Pachytodes cerambyciformis can reach a length of 7–12 mm. These beetles have a quite compact body. Elytra are only about twice as long as broad, and clearly narrower towards the end. Head, pronotum and legs are black. Elitra are matt, light brownish-yellow, with black markings, which are very variable and sometimes absent. Usually they show two transversal black bands and a black apex. The first band usually is not continuous, while the second black band is narrower in the center. The suture is normally light brownish-yellow.

This species is very similar to Pachytodes erraticus. The differences are listed in the below table.

== Distribution and habitat ==
This beetle can be found in most of Europe and in western Asia. It is missing in the North Europe, while in Central Europe it is one of the most common species. In particular it is present in Albania, Austria, Belarus, Belgium, Bosnia and Herzegovina, Bulgaria, Croatia, Czech Republic, Denmark, France, Germany, Hungary, Italy, Latvia, Lithuania, Luxembourg, Moldova, Netherlands, North Macedonia, Poland, Romania, Russia, Serbia, Slovakia, Slovenia, Spain, Switzerland, Turkey, Ukraine, United Kingdom. This species inhabit especially hilly and mountainous areas.

== Biology ==
Adults are often encountered on flowers from May through August. Larvae eat many species of deciduous and coniferous trees, mainly feeding on the roots of Abies alba, Picea abies, Castanea sativa, Salix caprea and Aegopodium podagraria. In April or May larvae leave the host plant and pupate in the ground. The life cycle is complete in two years.

Comparison between Pachytodes cerambyciformis and Pachytodes erraticus
Elytra, close-up on the middle band		Hind legs, detail
P. cerambyciformis
P. cerambyciformis matte roughly punctured a ridge between the spots	P. erratica shiny less coarse punctures greater distance between the spots	P. erratica Green line: end of the fourth tarsus

== Bibliography ==
- Bernhard Klausnitzer / Friedrich Sander: Die Bockkäfer Mitteleuropas. Die Neue Brehm-Bücherei 499. A. Ziemsen Verlag, DDR Wittenberg Lutherstadt, 1981
- Adolf Horion: Faunistik der mitteleuropäischen Käfer, Band XII: Cerambycidae – Bockkäfer. Überlingen, 1974
