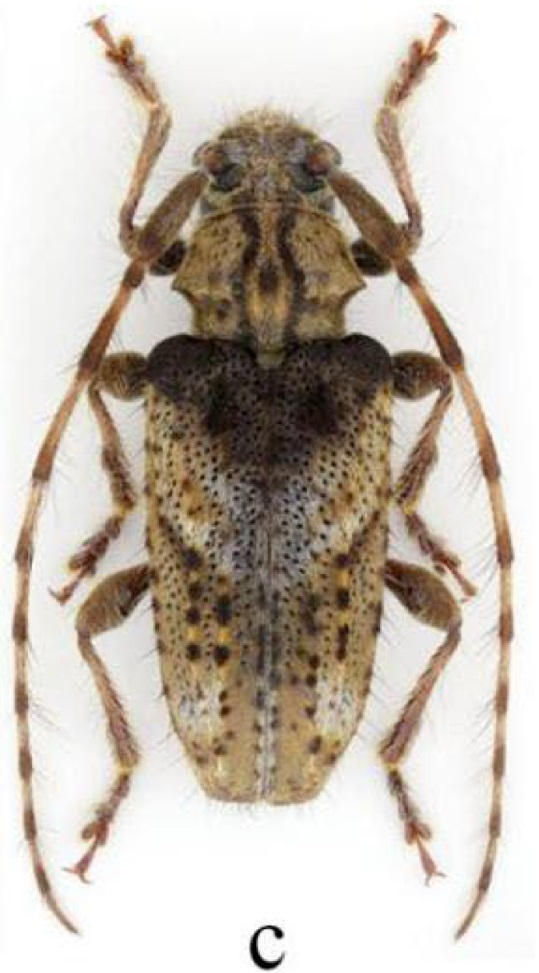

Scientific classification
- Kingdom: Animalia
- Phylum: Arthropoda
- Class: Insecta
- Order: Coleoptera
- Suborder: Polyphaga
- Infraorder: Cucujiformia
- Family: Cerambycidae
- Genus: Trichorondonia
- Species: T. kabateki

Binomial name
- Trichorondonia kabateki Viktora, 2024

= Trichorondonia kabateki =

Species of beetle

Trichorondonia kabateki is a species of beetle of the family Cerambycidae. It is found in China (Sichuan, Hubei).

== Description ==
Adults reach a length of about 8.5–8.8 mm. They have a chestnut to blackish-brown body, covered with greyish-yellow, greyish-white and blackish-brown hairs, along with sparse blackish-brown and greyish-white bristles. The legs and ventral side are covered with long greyish-white hairs.
