= Pogonocherus caroli =

Scientific classification
- Domain: Eukaryota
- Kingdom: Animalia
- Phylum: Arthropoda
- Class: Insecta
- Order: Coleoptera
- Suborder: Polyphaga
- Infraorder: Cucujiformia
- Family: Cerambycidae
- Tribe: Pogonocherini
- Genus: Pogonocherus
- Species: P. caroli

Binomial name
- Pogonocherus caroli Mulsant, 1863

Synonyms
- Eupogonocherus caroli (Mulsant) Villiers, 1978

Species of beetle

Pogonocherus caroli is a species of beetle in the family Cerambycidae. It was described by Mulsant in 1863. It is known from France, Algeria, Tunisia, Spain, and (since 2006) Scotland.

== Subspecies ==
- Pogonocherus caroli caroli Mulsant, 1863
- Pogonocherus caroli icosiensis Peyerimhoff, 1918
