= Pogonocherus parvulus =

Scientific classification
- Domain: Eukaryota
- Kingdom: Animalia
- Phylum: Arthropoda
- Class: Insecta
- Order: Coleoptera
- Suborder: Polyphaga
- Infraorder: Cucujiformia
- Family: Cerambycidae
- Tribe: Pogonocherini
- Genus: Pogonocherus
- Species: P. parvulus

Binomial name
- Pogonocherus parvulus LeConte, 1852

Synonyms
- Pogonocherus mixtus Caulfield, 1881; Pogonocherus salicola Casey, 1913

Species of beetle

Pogonocherus parvulus is a species of beetle in the family Cerambycidae. It was described by John Lawrence LeConte in 1852. It is known from Canada and the United States.
