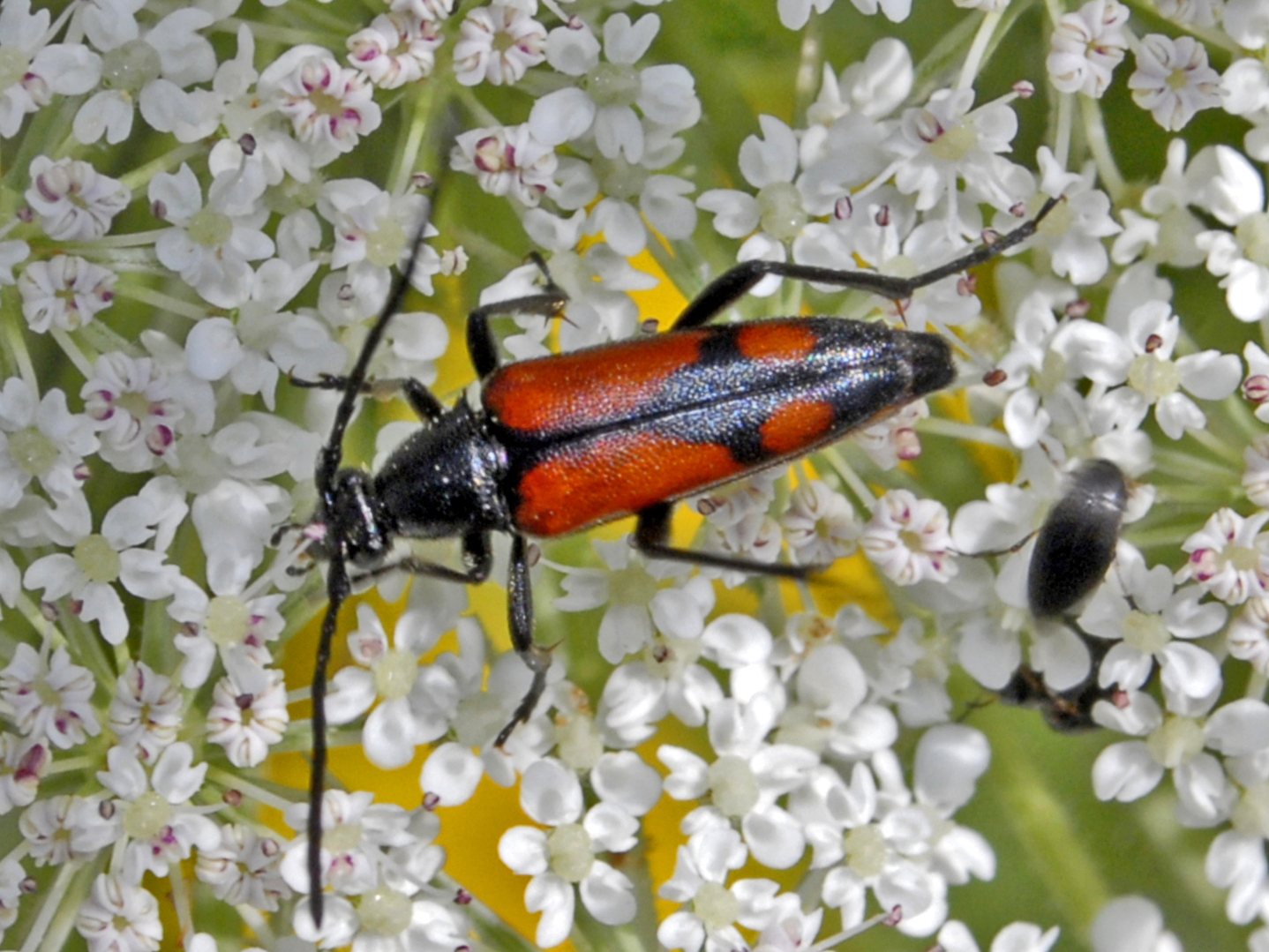
- Stenurella bifasciata, female

Scientific classification
- Kingdom: Animalia
- Phylum: Arthropoda
- Class: Insecta
- Order: Coleoptera
- Suborder: Polyphaga
- Infraorder: Cucujiformia
- Family: Cerambycidae
- Genus: Stenurella
- Species: S. bifasciata

Binomial name
- Stenurella bifasciata (O. F. Müller, 1776)

Synonyms
- Leptura (Stenurella) bifasciata Müller, 1776; Leptura bifasciata Müller, 1776; Leptura cruciata Olivier, 1795; Leptura quadrifasciata Poda, 1761 nec Linnaeus, 1758; Leptura ustulata Laicharting, 1784 nec Schaller, 1783; Stenura sedakovii Mannerheim, 1852; Strangalia bifasciata (Müller, 1766); Leptura melanura (Linnaeus) Herbst, 1784

= Stenurella bifasciata =

Species of beetle

Stenurella bifasciata is a species of beetle in the family Cerambycidae.

== Etymology ==
The Latin species name bifasciata means "with a double fascia".

== Subspecies ==
- Stenurella bifasciata intermedia Holzschuh, 2006
- Stenurella bifasciata lanceolata (Mulsant & Rey, 1863)
- Stenurella bifasciata limbiventris (Reitter, 1898)
- Stenurella bifasciata nigrosuturalis (Reitter, 1895)
- Stenurella bifasciata safronovi Danilevsky, 2011

== Distribution ==
This species is present in most of Europe, in the eastern Palearctic realm, and in the Near East (Albania, Austria, Belarus, Belgium, Bosnia and Herzegovina, Bulgaria, China, Corsica, Croatia, Czech Republic, Estonia, France, Georgia, Germany, Greece, Hungary, Iran, Italy, Kazakhstan, Latvia, Lebanon, Lithuania, Luxembourg, Macedonia, Moldova, Montenegro, Poland, Portugal, Romania, Russia, Sardinia, Serbia, Sicily, Slovakia, Slovenia, Spain, Switzerland, Syria, Turkey, and Ukraine).

== Habitat ==
These longhorn beetles live in meadows and slopes in foothills and valleys.

== Description ==
Stenurella bifasciata can reach a length of 6–10 millimetres (0.24–0.39 in). Head, antennae, pronotum and legs are black. Pronotum is slightly punctured. Elytra are yellow brown in the males, while in the females they are red, with a widely darkened elytron's suture, black apices and a black heart-shaped or rhomboid marking, sometimes missing in the males. The last three abdominal segments are usually red. The eleventh (last) antennal segment is longer than the tenth.

== Biology ==
Life cycle last 2 years. Larvae develop in dead wood of deciduous trees. They mainly feed on Pedunculate Oak (Quercus robur), Fig (Ficus carica), White Willow (Salix alba), Dog-rose (Rosa canina) and Spanish Broom (Spartium junceum). Adults can be seen from May to September.

== Gallery ==
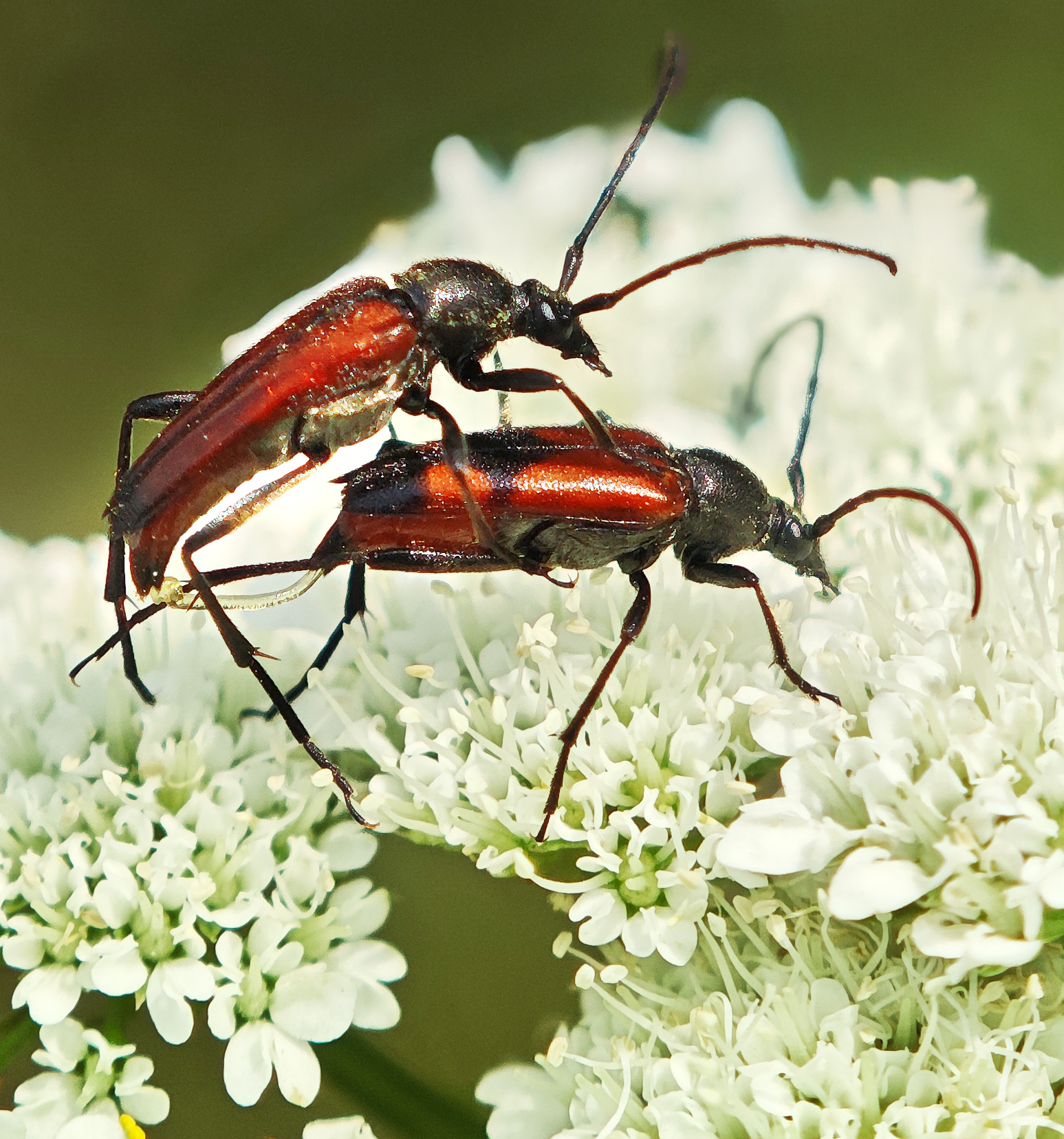
Stenurella bifasciata mating on Oenanthe pimpinelloides

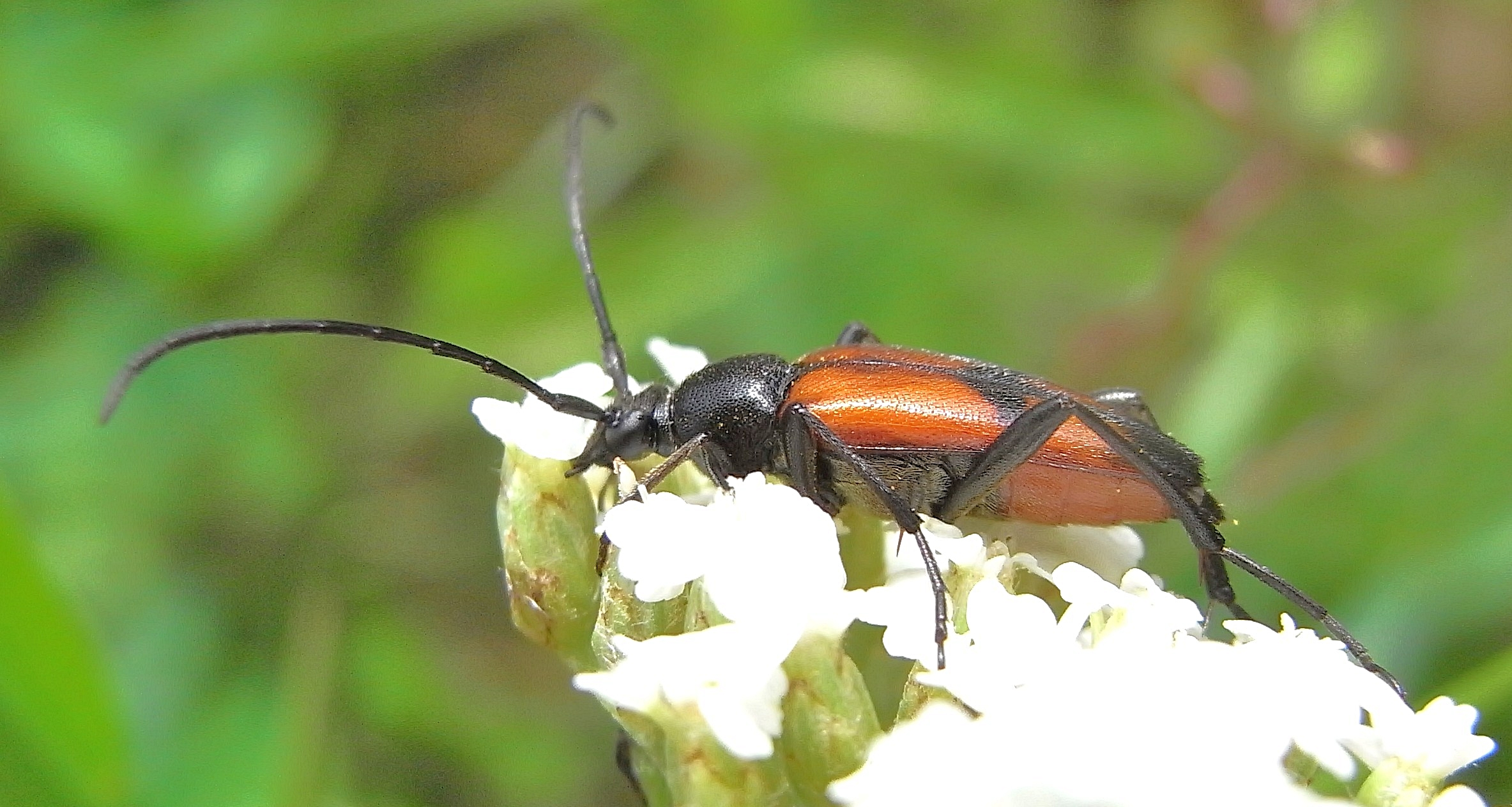
Female of S. bifasciata

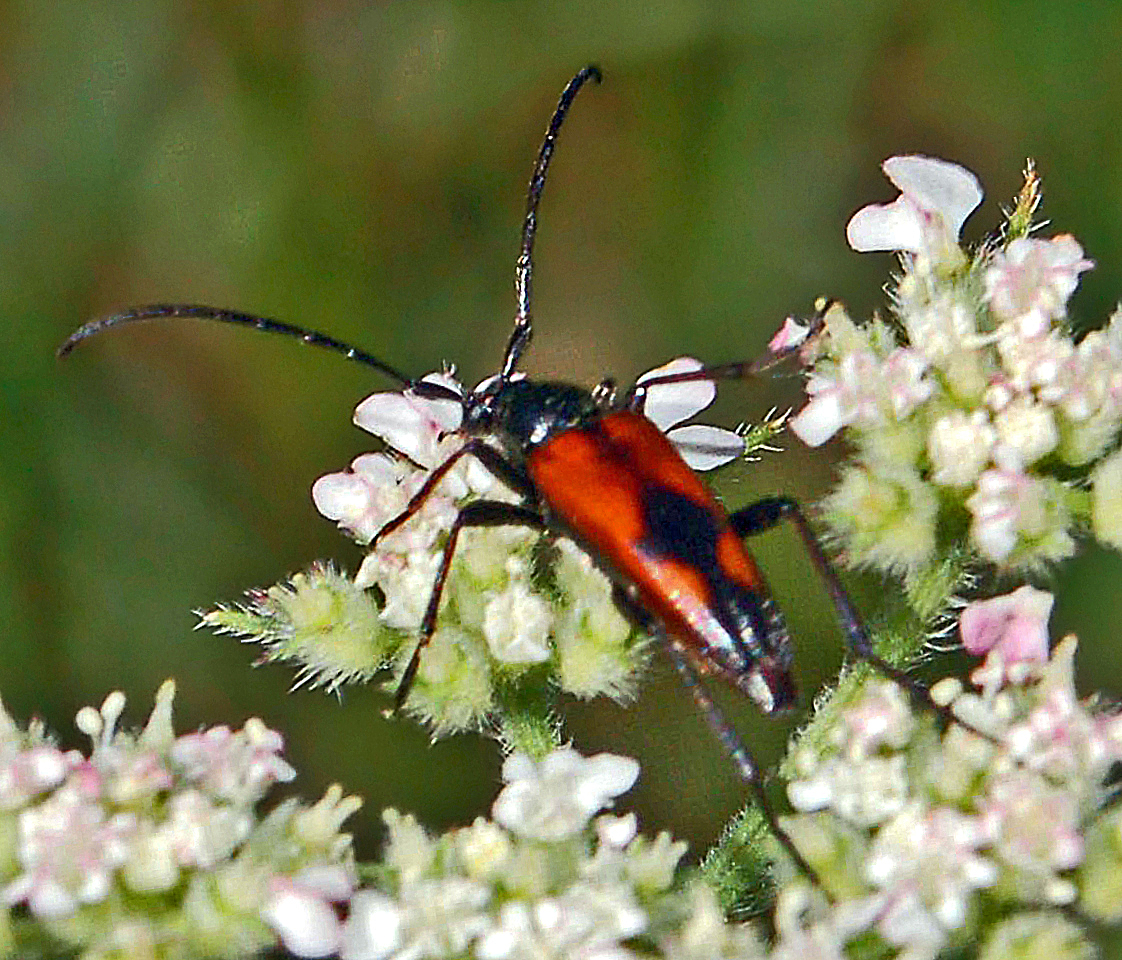
S. bifasciata

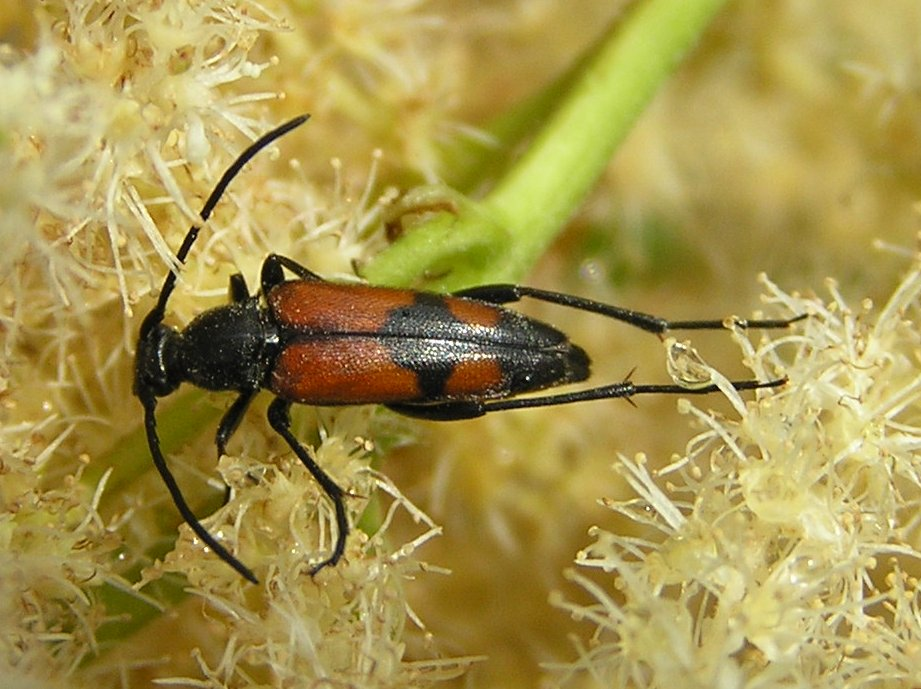
S. bifasciata feeding on Aruncus sylvestris

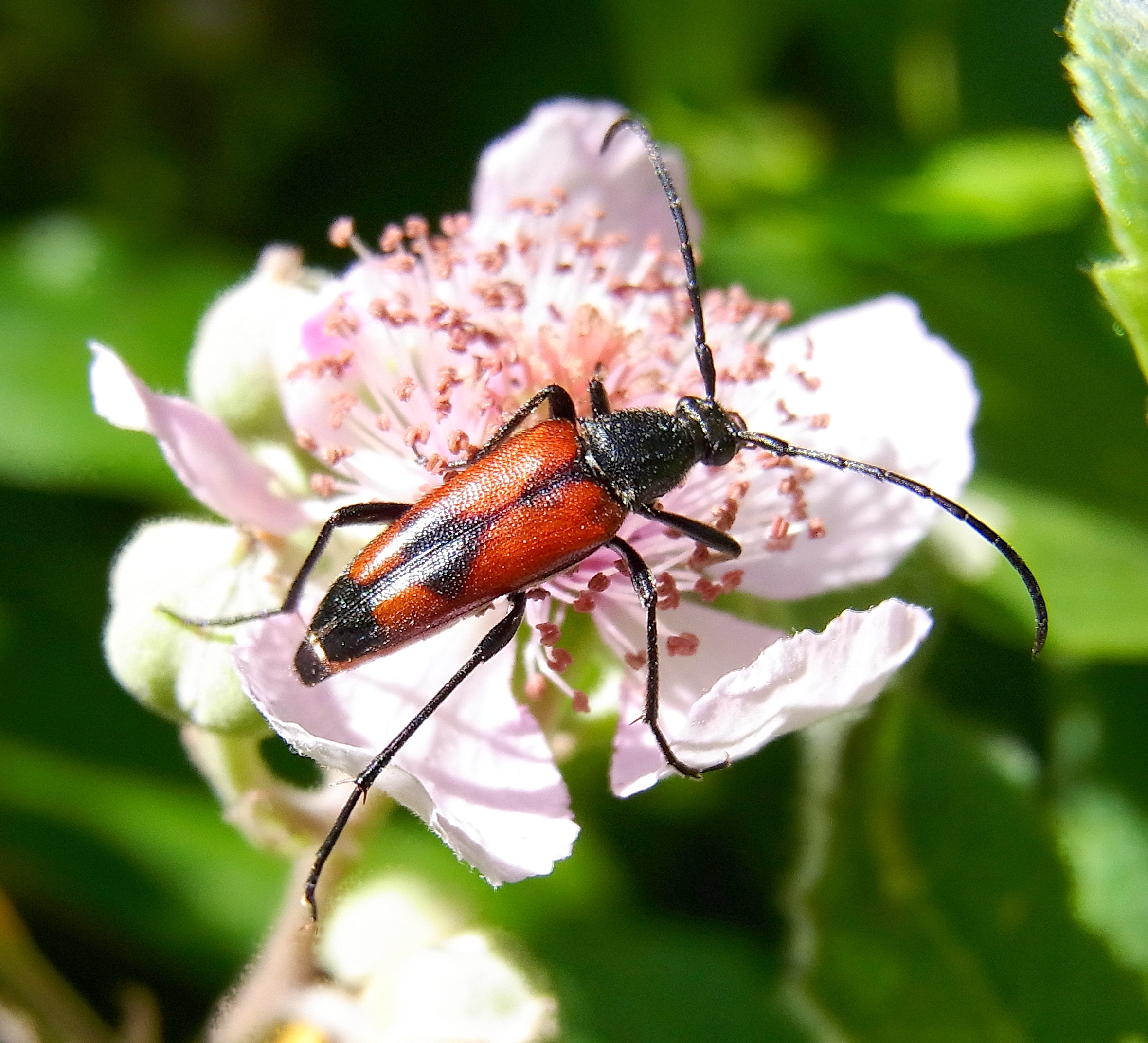
S. bifasciata feeding on Rosa canina
