= West Country =

Southwestern area of England

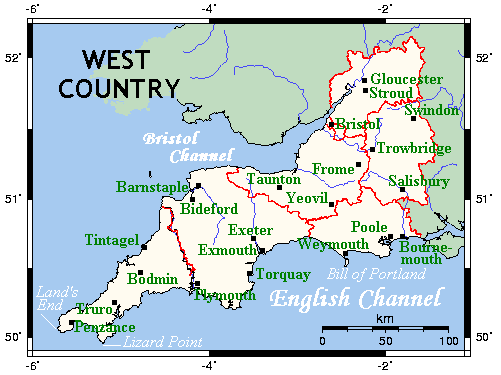
One interpretation of the West Country, shown on this map as identical to the South West region of England, incorporating the counties of Bristol, Cornwall, Devon, Dorset, Gloucestershire, Somerset and Wiltshire

The West Country is a loosely defined area within South West England, usually taken to include the counties of Cornwall, Devon, Dorset, Somerset and Bristol, with some considering it to extend to all or parts of Wiltshire, Gloucestershire and Herefordshire. The West Country has a distinctive regional English dialect and accent, and is also home to the Cornish language.

== Extent ==
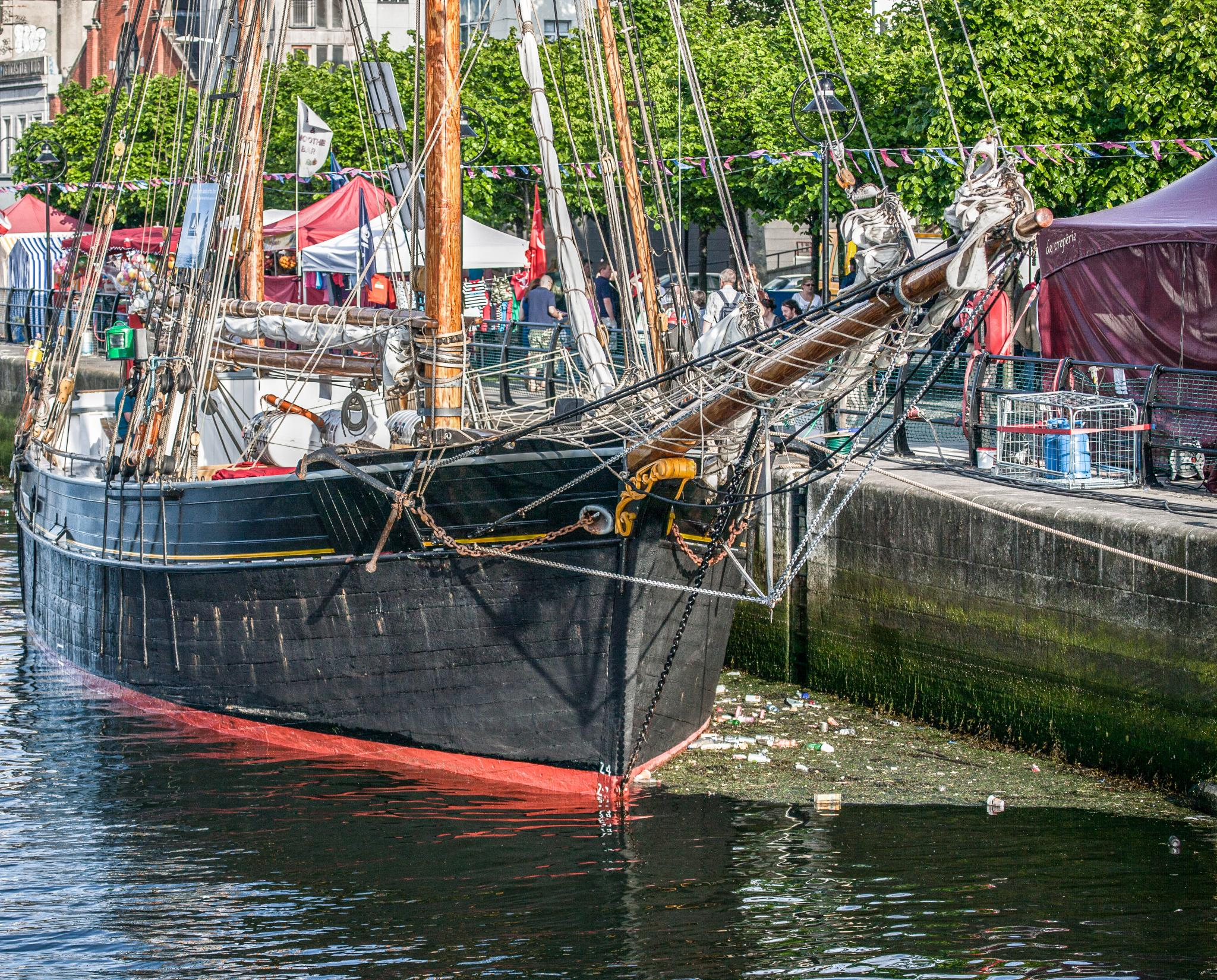
A West Country trading ketch, a term widely used by the 18th century

The West Country is bounded by the English Channel to the south and the Atlantic Ocean, Bristol Channel and Severn Estuary to the north. The eastern limit is less clearly defined.

Some definitions match that of the official South West England region. In a 2019 YouGov survey, 72% of respondents considered Cornwall and Devon to be in the West Country, while 70% included Somerset, 69% included Bristol, and 55% included Dorset. Other counties received less than 50% agreement, with 28% including Wiltshire, 27% including Gloucestershire, 12% including Herefordshire and 9% including Worcestershire, though those last two counties are officially part of the West Midlands region.

== Specific uses ==
During Jack Cade's Rebellion in 1450, English chroniclers described an uprising in Wiltshire being carried out by: "the comenys of the weste contre", indicating that in the late medieval period the county was certainly considered by contemporaries to be part of the West Country.

West Country Carnivals are held in many towns in and around Somerset.

A map of the West Country was produced for motorists by Esso in 1932. Bristol and Salisbury form the most northerly and easterly cities on the map respectively, marking the one interpretation of the region at that time.

West Country Lamb and West Country Beef are EU Protected Geographical Indications (PGI) covering products from animals born and reared in Cornwall, Devon, Dorset, Somerset, Wiltshire or Gloucestershire. "West Country Farmhouse Cheddar" is a Protected Designation of Origin (PDO) limited to cheddar cheese made in the traditional way in Cornwall, Devon, Dorset or Somerset.

ITV West Country is an ITV franchise which broadcasts local news, weather and current affairs programmes over two regions; ITV West Country West covering the Isles of Scilly, Cornwall, Devon and parts of Dorset and Somerset with ITV West Country East covering the remainder of Somerset and Dorset together with Bristol, Gloucestershire and Wiltshire.

A government-supported museum, galleries, and major attractions atlas matched the South West Region, save for Gloucestershire.

The term West Country derby is used to refer to sports matches between such cities as Bristol and Bath or Gloucester and Bath.

A former brewery in Cheltenham traded as West Country Ales; their ceramic plaques can still be seen built into pub walls around Gloucestershire, Herefordshire, Oxfordshire, Wiltshire, Worcestershire and parts of Wales.

== See also ==
- Dumnonia
- Durotriges
- Scrumpy and Western music
- South West Peninsula
- Thomas Hardy's Wessex
- Wessex
- West Country–class locomotives
- West of England
