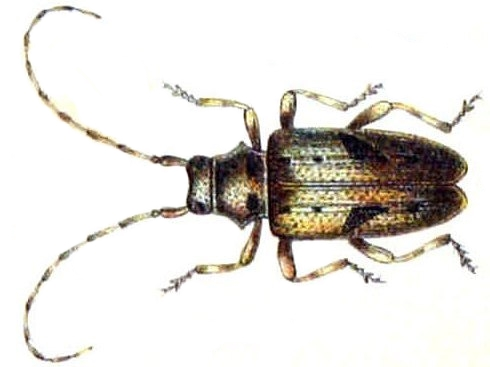

Scientific classification
- Domain: Eukaryota
- Kingdom: Animalia
- Phylum: Arthropoda
- Class: Insecta
- Order: Coleoptera
- Suborder: Polyphaga
- Infraorder: Cucujiformia
- Family: Cerambycidae
- Tribe: Pogonocherini
- Genus: Pogonocherus
- Species: P. ovatus

Binomial name
- Pogonocherus ovatus (Goeze, 1777)

Synonyms
- Cerambyx ovalis Gmelin, 1790; Cerambyx ovatus Goeze, 1777 nec Sulzer, 1776; Lamia ovalis (Gmelin, 1790); Pityphilus ovatus (Goeze, 1777); Pogonocherus multipunctatus Georg, 1857; Pogonocherus ovalis (Gmelin, 1790); Pogonocherus schlumbergeri Dufour, 1851; Pogonocherus scutellaris Mulsant, 1846

= Pogonocherus ovatus =

Species of beetle

Pogonocherus ovatus is a species of beetle in the family Cerambycidae. It was described by Johann August Ephraim Goeze in 1777, originally under the genus Cerambyx. It has a wide distribution throughout Europe, although it has become extinct in several countries, including Luxembourg, Belgium and the Netherlands. It measures between 4 and 6 mm (0.16 and 0.24 in). It contains the varietas Pogonocherus ovatus var. subovatus.

P. ovatus feeds on Corylus avellana, Abies alba, Abies cephalonica, Ilex aquifolium, and Castanea sativa.
