= Pogonocherus neuhausi =

Scientific classification
- Domain: Eukaryota
- Kingdom: Animalia
- Phylum: Arthropoda
- Class: Insecta
- Order: Coleoptera
- Suborder: Polyphaga
- Infraorder: Cucujiformia
- Family: Cerambycidae
- Tribe: Pogonocherini
- Genus: Pogonocherus
- Species: P. neuhausi

Binomial name
- Pogonocherus neuhausi Müller, 1916

Species of beetle

Pogonocherus neuhausi is a species of beetle in the family Cerambycidae. It was described by Müller in 1916. It is known from Italy, Bosnia and Herzegovina, and Croatia. It feeds on Pinus sylvestris, Pinus halepensis, and Pinus pinea.
