= Pogonocherus arizonicus =

Scientific classification
- Domain: Eukaryota
- Kingdom: Animalia
- Phylum: Arthropoda
- Class: Insecta
- Order: Coleoptera
- Suborder: Polyphaga
- Infraorder: Cucujiformia
- Family: Cerambycidae
- Tribe: Pogonocherini
- Genus: Pogonocherus
- Species: P. arizonicus

Binomial name
- Pogonocherus arizonicus Schäffer, 1908

Synonyms
- Pogonocherus medianus Linsley, 1935

Species of beetle

Pogonocherus arizonicus is a species of beetle in the family Cerambycidae. It was described by Gottlieb August Wilhelm Herrich-Schäffer in 1908. It is known from Mexico and the United States.
