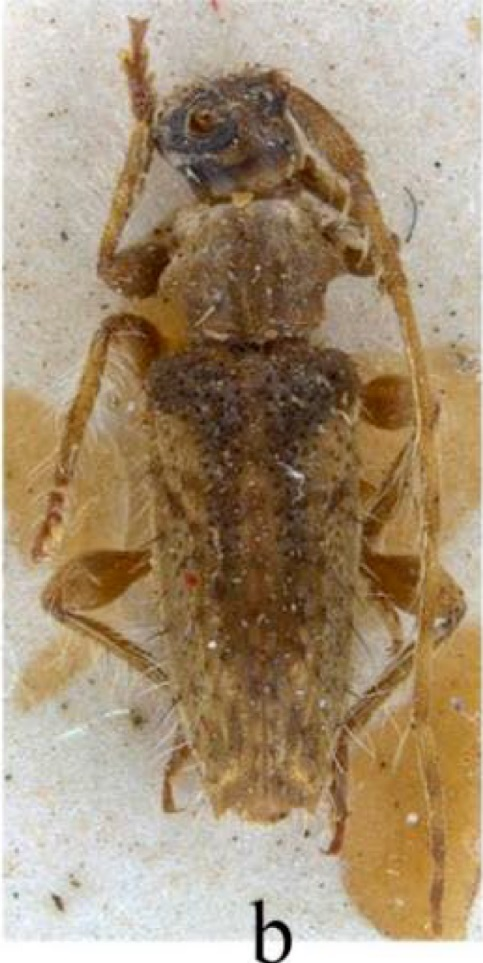

Scientific classification
- Kingdom: Animalia
- Phylum: Arthropoda
- Class: Insecta
- Order: Coleoptera
- Suborder: Polyphaga
- Infraorder: Cucujiformia
- Family: Cerambycidae
- Genus: Trichorondonia
- Species: T. hybolasioides

Binomial name
- Trichorondonia hybolasioides Breuning, 1965

= Trichorondonia hybolasioides =

Species of beetle

Trichorondonia hybolasioides is a species of beetle of the family Cerambycidae. It is found in China (Guangxi) and Laos.
