= Pogonocherus pesarinii =

Scientific classification
- Domain: Eukaryota
- Kingdom: Animalia
- Phylum: Arthropoda
- Class: Insecta
- Order: Coleoptera
- Suborder: Polyphaga
- Infraorder: Cucujiformia
- Family: Cerambycidae
- Tribe: Pogonocherini
- Genus: Pogonocherus
- Species: P. pesarinii

Binomial name
- Pogonocherus pesarinii Sama, 1993

Species of beetle

Pogonocherus pesarinii is a species of beetle in the family Cerambycidae. It was described by Sama in 1993. It is known from Morocco.
