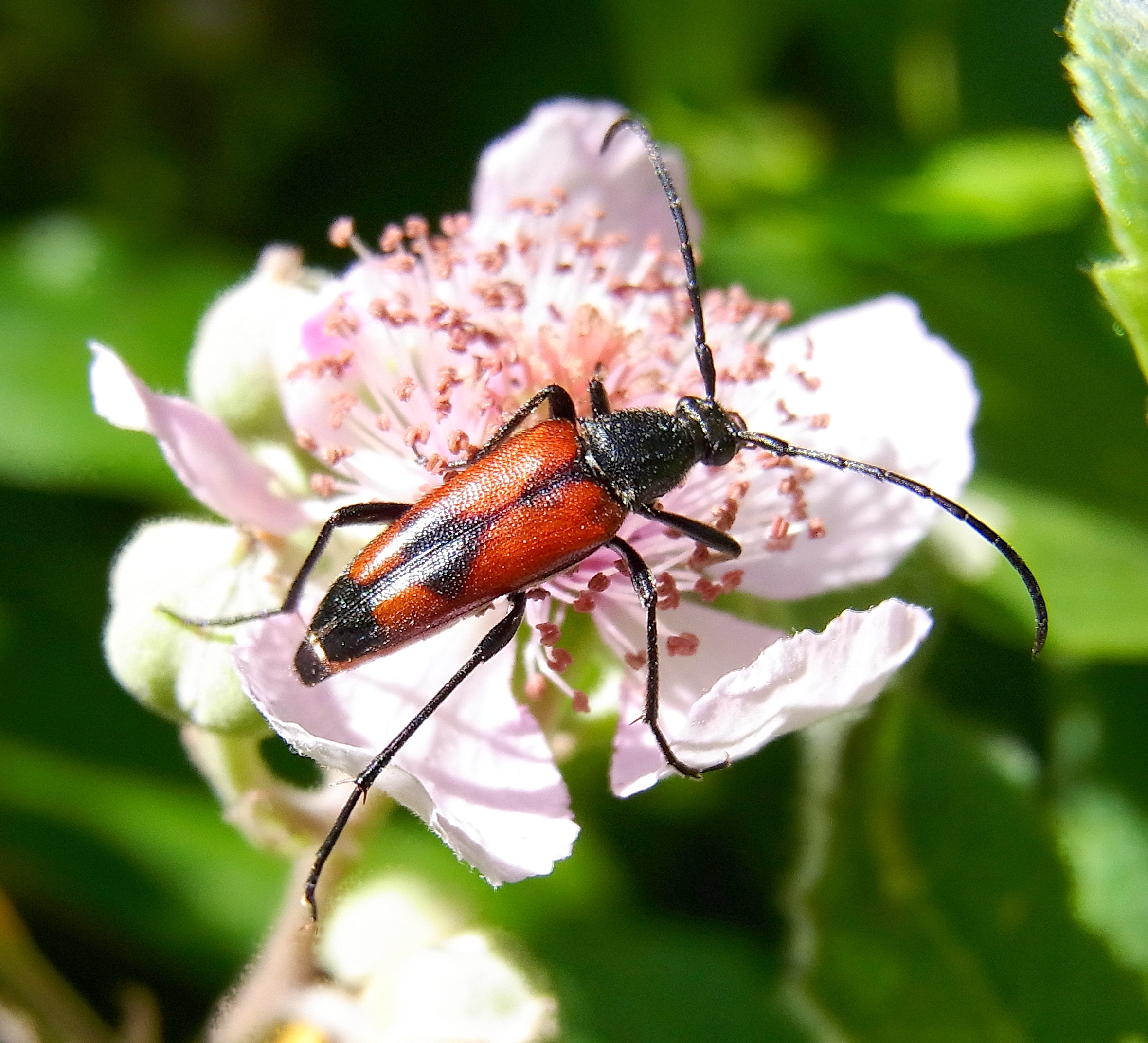
- Stenurella bifasciata

Scientific classification
- Kingdom: Animalia
- Phylum: Arthropoda
- Class: Insecta
- Order: Coleoptera
- Suborder: Polyphaga
- Infraorder: Cucujiformia
- Family: Cerambycidae
- Tribe: Lepturini
- Genus: Stenurella; Villiers, 1974

Synonyms
- Leptura (Stenurella) (Villiers) Sama, 1988

= Stenurella =

Genus of beetles

Stenurella is a genus of beetles in the family Cerambycidae.

== Species ==
- Stenurella approximans (Rosenhauer, 1856)
- Stenurella bifasciata (O.F. Müller, 1776)
- Stenurella hybridula (Reitter, 1901)
- Stenurella jaegeri (Hummel, 1825)
- Stenurella lindbergi (Villiers, 1943)
- Stenurella melanura (Linnaeus, 1758)
- Stenurella nigra (Linnaeus, 1758)
- Stenurella novercalis (Reitter, 1901)
- Stenurella pamphyliae Rapuzzi & Sama, 2009
- Stenurella samai Rapuzzi, 1995
- Stenurella septempunctata (Fabricius, 1793)
- Stenurella vaucheri (Bedel, 1900)
