= Pogonocherus eugeniae =

Scientific classification
- Domain: Eukaryota
- Kingdom: Animalia
- Phylum: Arthropoda
- Class: Insecta
- Order: Coleoptera
- Suborder: Polyphaga
- Infraorder: Cucujiformia
- Family: Cerambycidae
- Tribe: Pogonocherini
- Genus: Pogonocherus
- Species: P. eugeniae

Binomial name
- Pogonocherus eugeniae Ganglbauer, 1891

Synonyms
- Pogonocherus eugeniae taygetanus (Pic) Sama, 1988; Pogonocherus taygetanus Pic, 1903

Species of beetle

Pogonocherus eugeniae is a species of beetle in the family Cerambycidae. It was described by Ganglbauer in 1891. It is known from Croatia, Bosnia and Herzegovina, Austria, Greece, Romania, and Italy.
