= Pogonocherus sturanii =

Scientific classification
- Domain: Eukaryota
- Kingdom: Animalia
- Phylum: Arthropoda
- Class: Insecta
- Order: Coleoptera
- Suborder: Polyphaga
- Infraorder: Cucujiformia
- Family: Cerambycidae
- Tribe: Pogonocherini
- Genus: Pogonocherus
- Species: P. sturanii

Binomial name
- Pogonocherus sturanii Sama & Schurmann, 1982

Species of beetle

Pogonocherus sturanii is a species of beetle in the family Cerambycidae. It was described by Sama and Schurmann in 1982. It is known from Spain.
