= Pogonocherus creticus =

Scientific classification
- Domain: Eukaryota
- Kingdom: Animalia
- Phylum: Arthropoda
- Class: Insecta
- Order: Coleoptera
- Suborder: Polyphaga
- Infraorder: Cucujiformia
- Family: Cerambycidae
- Tribe: Pogonocherini
- Genus: Pogonocherus
- Species: P. creticus

Binomial name
- Pogonocherus creticus Kratochvil, 1985

Species of beetle

Pogonocherus creticus is a species of beetle in the family Cerambycidae. It was described by Kratochvil in 1985. It is known from Crete.
