= Pogonocherus jaekeli =

Scientific classification
- Domain: Eukaryota
- Kingdom: Animalia
- Phylum: Arthropoda
- Class: Insecta
- Order: Coleoptera
- Suborder: Polyphaga
- Infraorder: Cucujiformia
- Family: Cerambycidae
- Tribe: Pogonocherini
- Genus: Pogonocherus
- Species: P. jaekeli

Binomial name
- Pogonocherus jaekeli Zang, 1905 †

Synonyms
- Pogonochaerus jaekeli Zang, 1905

Species of beetle

Pogonocherus jaekeli is an extinct species of beetle in the family Cerambycidae, that existed during the Lower Oligocene. It was described by Zang in 1905.
