= Pogonocherus mixtus =

Scientific classification
- Domain: Eukaryota
- Kingdom: Animalia
- Phylum: Arthropoda
- Class: Insecta
- Order: Coleoptera
- Suborder: Polyphaga
- Infraorder: Cucujiformia
- Family: Cerambycidae
- Tribe: Pogonocherini
- Genus: Pogonocherus
- Species: P. mixtus

Binomial name
- Pogonocherus mixtus Haldeman, 1847

Synonyms
- Pogonocherus simplex LeConte, 1873

Species of beetle

Pogonocherus mixtus is a species of beetle in the family Cerambycidae. It was described by Haldeman in 1847. It is known from Canada and the United States.
