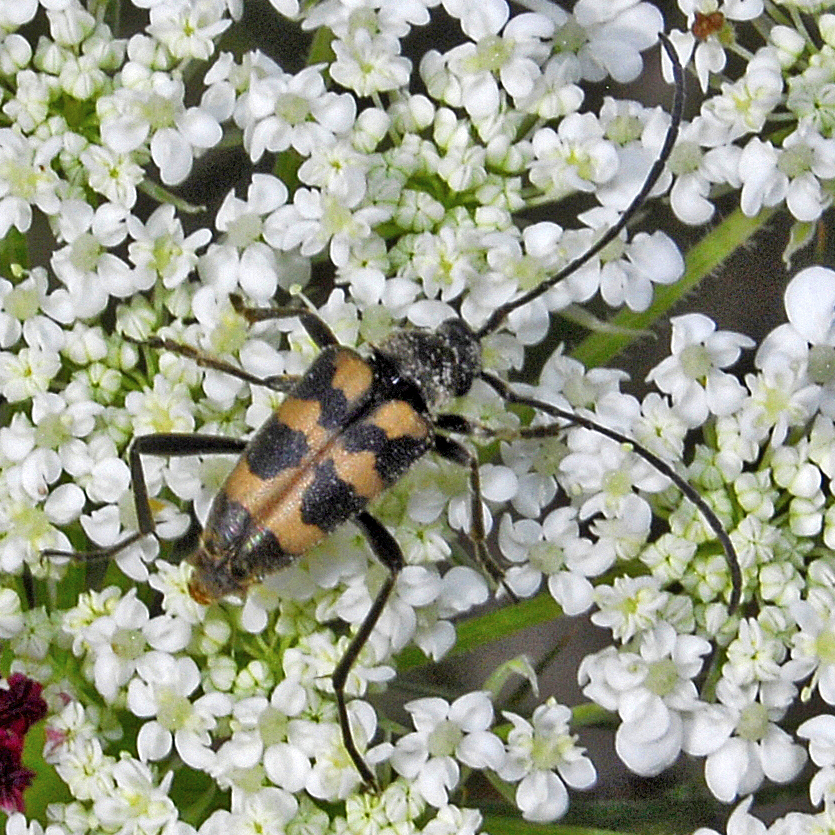
- Pachytodes cerambyciformis

Scientific classification
- Kingdom: Animalia
- Phylum: Arthropoda
- Class: Insecta
- Order: Coleoptera
- Suborder: Polyphaga
- Infraorder: Cucujiformia
- Family: Cerambycidae
- Subfamily: Lepturinae
- Tribe: Lepturini
- Genus: Pachytodes; Pic, 1891

= Pachytodes =

Genus of beetles

Pachytodes is a genus of beetle belonging to the family Cerambycidae, subfamily Lepturinae (flower longhorns).

== Species ==
There are five recognized species:

- Pachytodes bottcheri Pic, 1911
- Pachytodes cerambyciformis (Schrank, 1781)
- Pachytodes cometes (Bates, 1884)
- Pachytodes erraticus (Dalman, 1817)
- Pachytodes longipes (Gebler, 1832)
