= South West Peninsula =

Peninsula of Great Britain

Coordinates: 50°48′N 3°54′W

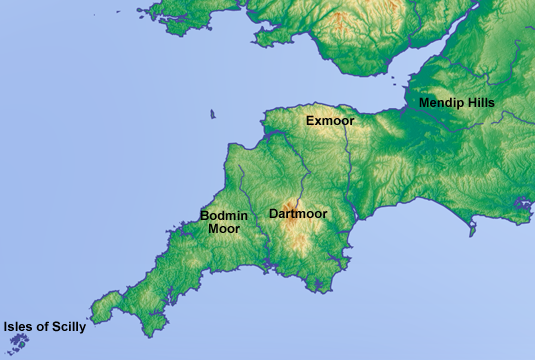
The peninsula, which is the longest in England.

The South West Peninsula is the area of England between the Bristol Channel to the north and the English Channel to the south. It is part of the South West region of England, and includes the counties of Cornwall, Devon, and (depending on its precise definition) all or part of the counties of Somerset and Dorset.

== Current usage ==
Some official bodies, such as the Met Office, use the term. The South West Peninsula Football League, which covers Devon and Cornwall, uses the name. The region's postgraduate NHS Deanery, South West Peninsula Postgraduate Medical Education, uses the term.

== Past usage ==
The Peninsula College of Medicine and Dentistry, a medical school established by the University of Exeter and the University of Plymouth which operated between 2000 and 2013, referred to it, as did the South West Peninsula Strategic Health Authority before its 2006 demise.

== Limits ==
Land's End is the westernmost point of the peninsula and of England. The eastern limit may be defined as the 54.5-kilometre (33.9 mi) isthmus between the mouth of the river Parrett and Lyme Bay.

== See also ==
- List of peninsulas
- West Country
