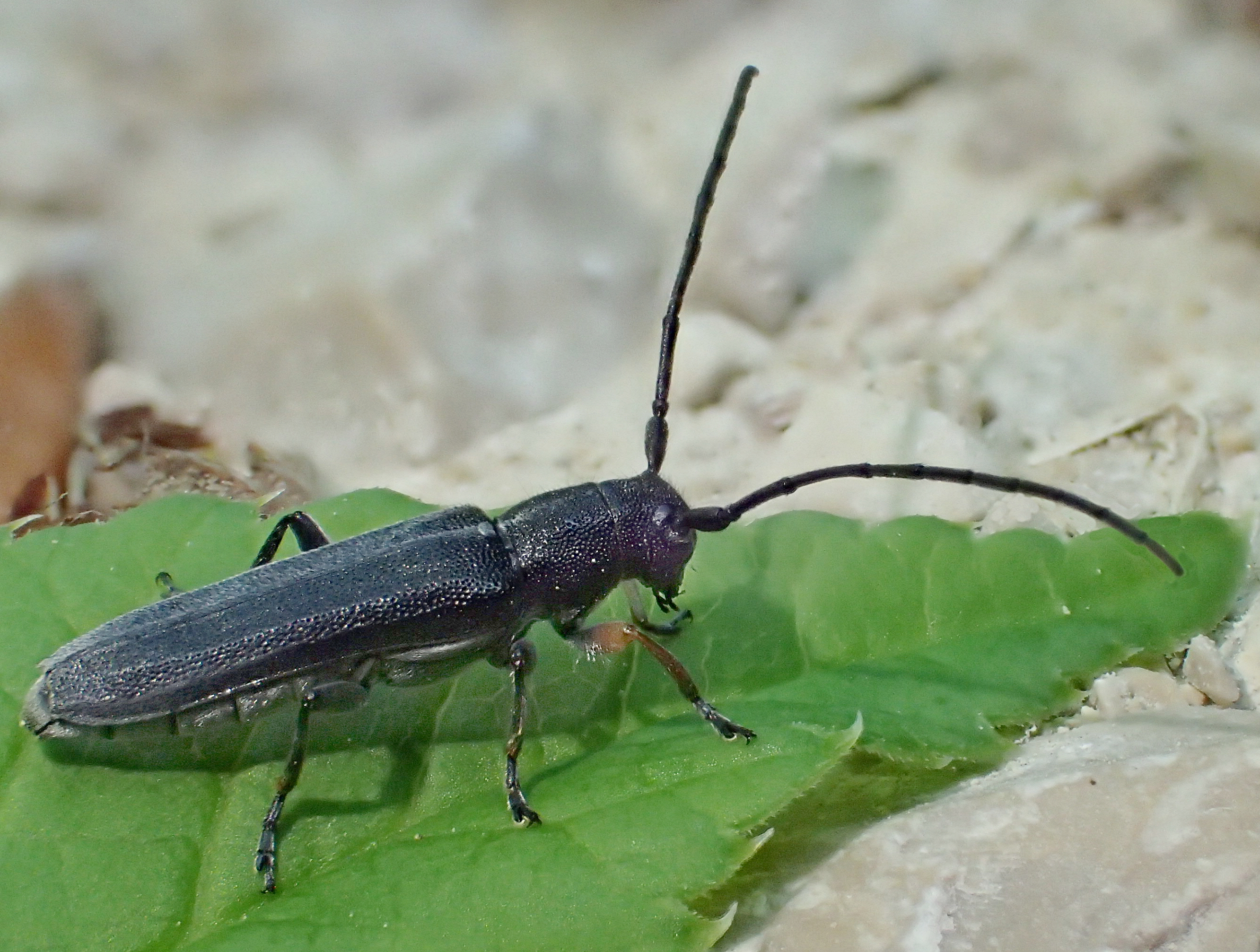

Scientific classification
- Kingdom: Animalia
- Phylum: Arthropoda
- Class: Insecta
- Order: Coleoptera
- Suborder: Polyphaga
- Infraorder: Cucujiformia
- Family: Cerambycidae
- Genus: Phytoecia
- Species: P. cylindrica

Binomial name
- Phytoecia cylindrica (Linnaeus, 1758)

Synonyms
- Cerambyx cylindricus Linnaeus, 1758; Cerambyx cinereus DeGeer, 1775; Phytoecia cylindrica kammereri Schatzmayr, 1928; Phytoecia simplonica Stierlin, 1879; Phytoecia cylindrica var. grandis Pic; Leptura fuliginosa Scopoli, 1786

= Phytoecia cylindrica =

Species of beetle

Phytoecia cylindrica is a species of beetle in the family Cerambycidae. It was described by Carl Linnaeus in 1758. It has a wide distribution throughout Europe. It feeds on Daucus carota, Laserpitium siler, Astrantia major, Anthriscus sylvestris, Heracleum sphondylium. It measures between 6 and 12 mm (0.24 and 0.47 in).
