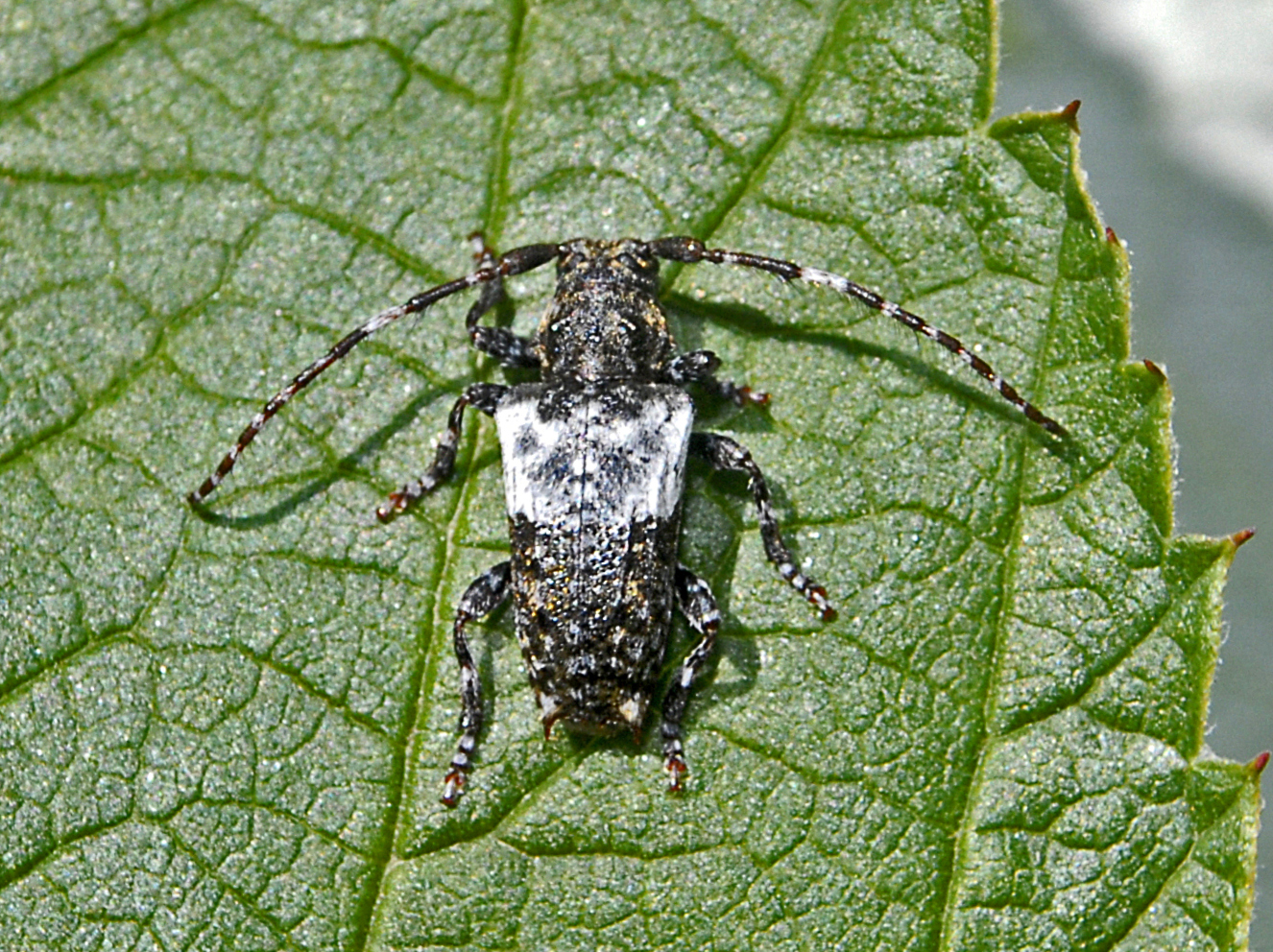

Scientific classification
- Domain: Eukaryota
- Kingdom: Animalia
- Phylum: Arthropoda
- Class: Insecta
- Order: Coleoptera
- Suborder: Polyphaga
- Infraorder: Cucujiformia
- Family: Cerambycidae
- Tribe: Pogonocherini
- Genus: Pogonocherus
- Species: P. hispidulus

Binomial name
- Pogonocherus hispidulus (Piller & Mitterpacher, 1783)

Synonyms
- Cerambyx hispidulus Piller & Mitterpacher, 1783; Eupogonocherus hispidulus (Piller & Mitterpacher) Villiers, 1978; Pogonocherus bidentatus Thomson, 1765; Cerambyx hispidus (Linnaeus) Fabricius, 1775; Lamia hispida (Linnaeus) Laicharting, 1784; Pogonocherus dentatus (Geoffroy) Sériziat, 1880; Pogonocherus pilosus (Fabricius) Shuck, 1840

= Pogonocherus hispidulus =

Species of beetle

Pogonocherus hispidulus, the greater thorn-tipped longhorn beetle, is a species of flat-faced longhorns beetle in the family Cerambycidae.

== Description ==
Pogonocherus hispidulus can reach a length of 5–8 millimetres (0.20–0.31 in). The basic color of the body is gray-black, with a wide whitish transverse band on scutellum. It has white marked antennae and a long tooth at the apex of each elytron. Adults can be found from April until August. The larvae are polyphagous, feeding in deciduous trees on small dead branches and dead twigs. The development usually takes two years.

== Distribution ==
This beetle is present in most of Europe, in Caucasus, Russia, the Near East and in Turkey.

== Habitat ==
This species lives on deciduous trees and shrubs.
