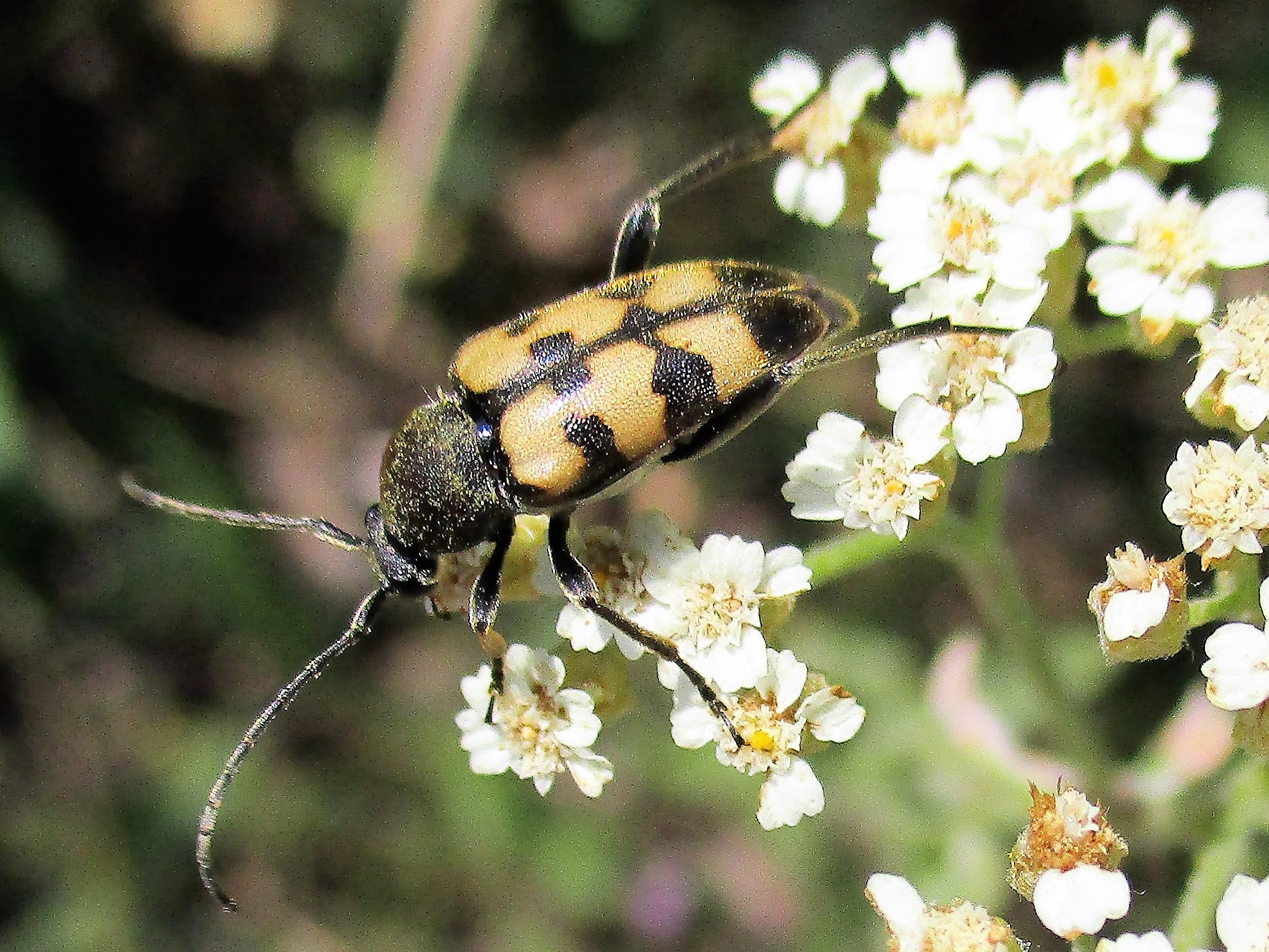

Scientific classification
- Kingdom: Animalia
- Phylum: Arthropoda
- Class: Insecta
- Order: Coleoptera
- Suborder: Polyphaga
- Infraorder: Cucujiformia
- Family: Cerambycidae
- Genus: Pachytodes
- Species: P. erraticus

Binomial name
- Pachytodes erraticus (Dalman, 1817)

= Pachytodes erraticus =

Species of beetle

Pachytodes erraticus , or Judolia erratica, is a species of beetle in the family Cerambycidae. It was described by Johan Wilhelm Dalman in 1817. Their body length ranges from 7 - 12mm. They live in underground parts of deciduous trees
