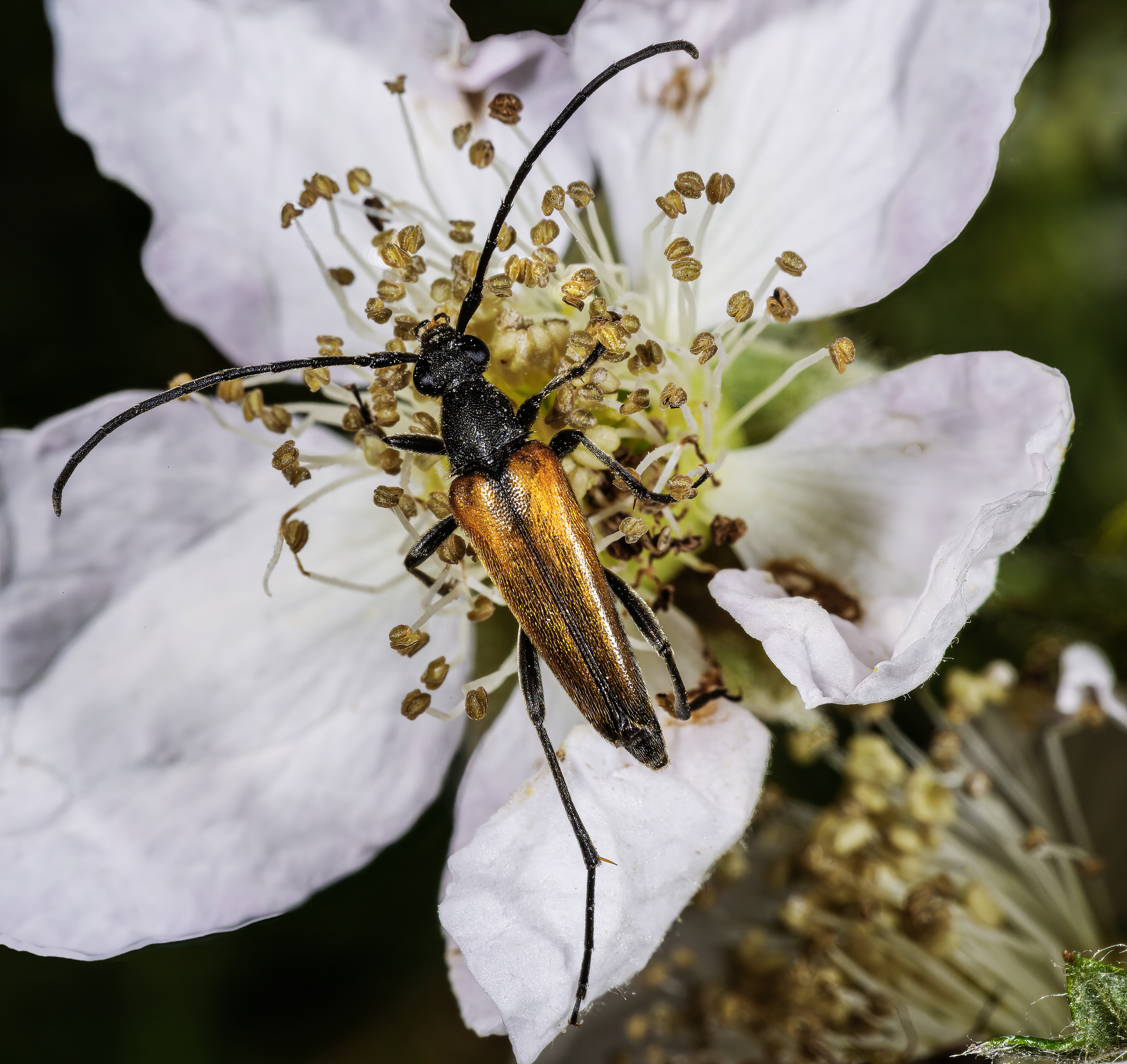
- Male
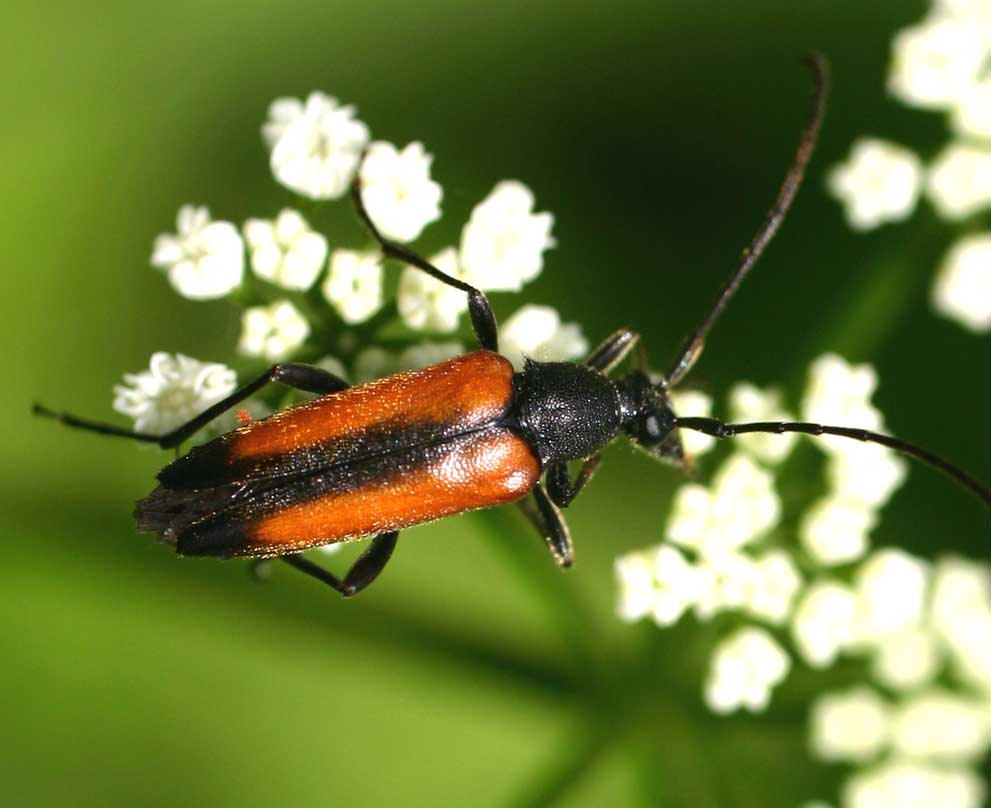
- Female

Scientific classification
- Kingdom: Animalia
- Phylum: Arthropoda
- Class: Insecta
- Order: Coleoptera
- Suborder: Polyphaga
- Infraorder: Cucujiformia
- Family: Cerambycidae
- Genus: Stenurella
- Species: S. melanura

Binomial name
- Stenurella melanura (Linnaeus, 1758)

Synonyms
- Leptura (Stenurella) melanura (Linnaeus) Sama, 1988; Leptura diversiventris Linnaeus, 1758; Leptura melanura (Linnaeus, 1758); Leptura similis Herbst, 1784; Leptura sutura nigra DeGeer, 1775; Strangalia melanura (Linnaeus) Mulsant, 1863; Stenurella sennii Sama, 2002

= Stenurella melanura =

Species of beetle

Stenurella melanura is a flower longhorn beetle species of the family Cerambycidae, subfamily Lepturinae.

== Subspecies and varietas ==
Subspecies and varietas include:

- Stenurella melanura melanura (Linnaeus, 1758)
- Stenurella melanura pamphiliae Rapuzzi & Sama, 2009 inq.
- Stenurella melanura samai Rapuzzi, 1995 inq.
- Stenurella melanura var. georgiana (Pic, 1891)
- Stenurella melanura var. latesuturata (Pic, 1891)
- Stenurella melanura var. melanurella (Reitter, 1901)
- Stenurella melanura var. rubellata (Reitter, 1901)

== Distribution ==
This beetle is widespread in most of Europe, in the eastern Palearctic realm, in the Oriental realm, and in the Near East.

It is present in Portugal, Spain, France, Belgium, the Netherlands, Switzerland, Italy, Germany, Austria, Great Britain, Denmark, Sweden, Norway, Finland, Poland, Czech Republic, Slovakia, Hungary, Slovenia, Croatia, Serbia, Albania, Romania, Bulgaria, Greece, Turkey, Russia, Kazakhstan and Mongolia.

== Habitat ==
These beetles inhabit sunny forest edges, mixed coniferous forests, spruce pine forests and alpine and mountain pastures.

== Description ==
S. melanura in copula

Stenurella melanura can reach a length of 6–10 millimetres (0.24–0.39 in). This beetle has a very narrow and rather long body. The antennae are about as long as the body. The head, pronotum and abdomen are black. The elytra are yellow-brown in males, with a black colored tip. In the females the elytra are reddish. The elytral suture is often black-colored, especially in the females, while the slender males have a darker tip and the black drawing is somewhat less pronounced.

== Biology ==
Both females and males can mate several times, and the males often remain on the female to prevent her from interacting with other males. Larvae develop in rotten wood of deciduous and coniferous trees, especially Castanea sativa. Adults can be encountered from May through September, completing their life cycle in two years. They are very common flower-visitors, especially Apiaceae species, feeding on pollen and the nectar.
