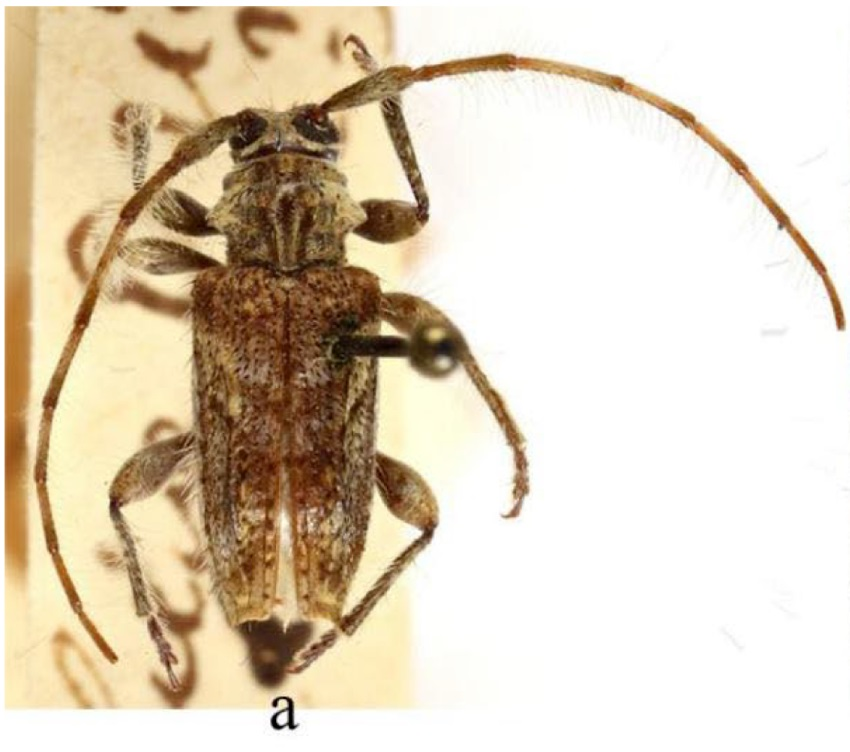

Scientific classification
- Kingdom: Animalia
- Phylum: Arthropoda
- Class: Insecta
- Order: Coleoptera
- Suborder: Polyphaga
- Infraorder: Cucujiformia
- Family: Cerambycidae
- Genus: Trichorondonia
- Species: T. pilosipes

Binomial name
- Trichorondonia pilosipes (Pic, 1907)

Synonyms
- Pogonocherus pilosipes Pic, 1907

= Trichorondonia pilosipes =

Species of beetle

Trichorondonia pilosipes is a species of beetle in the family Cerambycidae. It was described by Maurice Pic in 1907. It is known from China.
