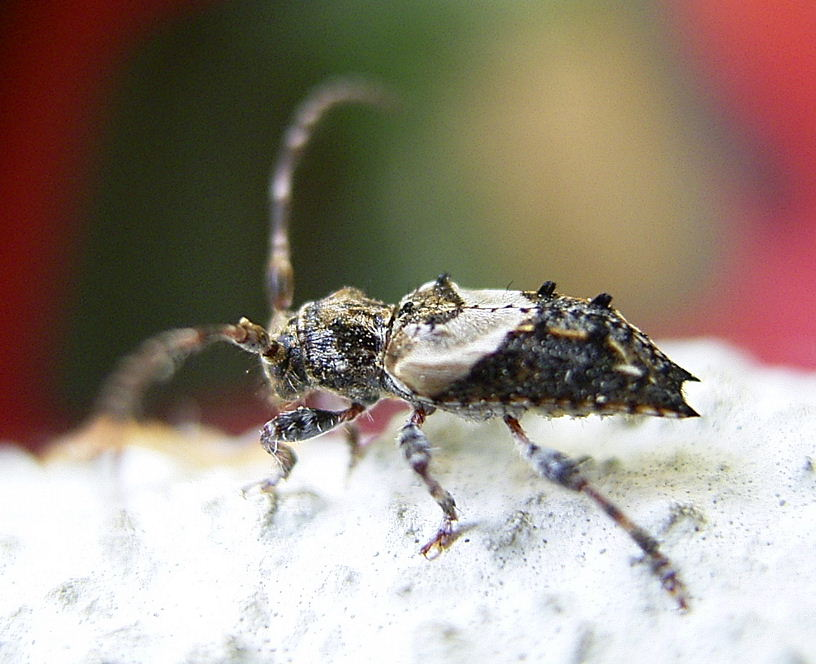

Scientific classification
- Kingdom: Animalia
- Phylum: Arthropoda
- Class: Insecta
- Order: Coleoptera
- Suborder: Polyphaga
- Infraorder: Cucujiformia
- Family: Cerambycidae
- Tribe: Pogonocherini
- Genus: Pogonocherus
- Species: P. hispidus

Binomial name
- Pogonocherus hispidus (Linnaeus, 1758)

Synonyms
- Cerambyx dentatus Geoffroy, 1785; Cerambyx hispidus Linnaeus, 1758; Cerambyx pilosus Fabricius, 1787 nec Poda, 1761; Eupogonocherus hispidus (Linnaeus) Villiers, 1978; Lamia pilosa (Fabricius) Schönherr, 1817; Pogonochaerus dentatus (Geoffroy) Severin, 1889

= Pogonocherus hispidus =

Species of beetle

Pogonocherus hispidus is a species of beetle in the family Cerambycidae. It was described by Carl Linnaeus in 1758, originally under the genus Cerambyx. It has a wide distribution throughout Europe and North Africa. It contains the varietas Pogonocherus hispidus var. rufescens.

P. hispidus feeds on Cornus sanguinea, Corylus avellana, Ilex aquifolium, Hedera helix, and Euonymus europaeus. It serves as a host for several parasitoid wasp species, including Dolichomitus agnoscendus, Eurytoma morio, Ephialtes manifestator, Lestricus secalis, and Cenocoelius aartseni. It measures between 4 and 6 mm (0.16 and 0.24 in).
