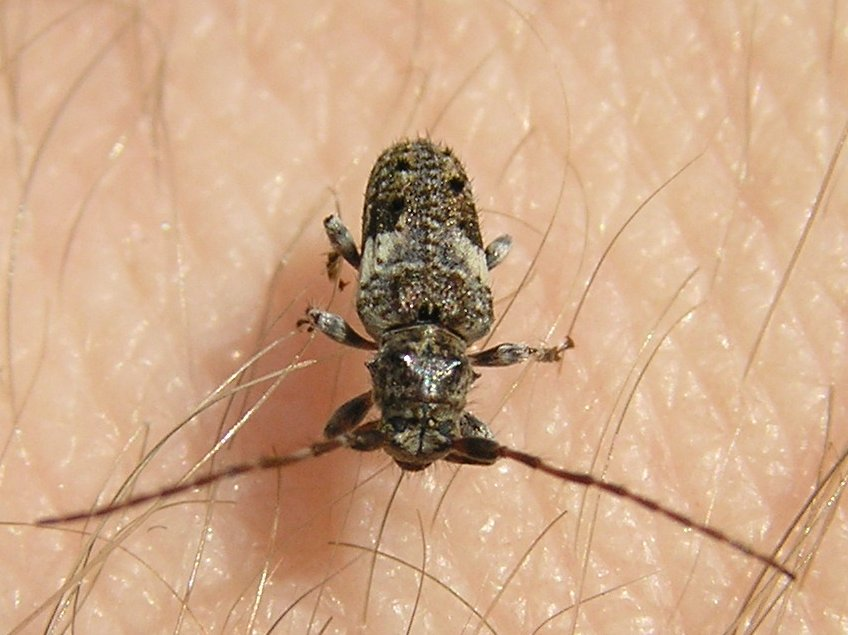

Scientific classification
- Domain: Eukaryota
- Kingdom: Animalia
- Phylum: Arthropoda
- Class: Insecta
- Order: Coleoptera
- Suborder: Polyphaga
- Infraorder: Cucujiformia
- Family: Cerambycidae
- Tribe: Pogonocherini
- Genus: Pogonocherus
- Species: P. fasciculatus

Binomial name
- Pogonocherus fasciculatus (De Geer, 1775)

Synonyms
- Cerambyx fasciculatus DeGeer, 1775; Cerambyx setifer Müller, 1776; Cerambyx griseoalbidus Voet, 1804-1806 (Unav.); Pogonocherus costatus Motschulsky, 1859; Pogonocherus fasciculatus costatus Motschulsky, 1859; Pogonocherus fasciculatus pullus Matsushita, 1931; Cerambyx fascicularis (DeGeer, 1775) (misspelling); Pogonocherus fascicularis (DeGeer, 1775) (misspelling); Pogonocherus fasciusculus (DeGeer, 1775) (misspelling); Pityphilus fasciculatus (DeGeer, 1775)

= Pogonocherus fasciculatus =

Species of beetle

Pogonocherus fasciculatus is a species of beetle in the family Cerambycidae. It was described by Charles De Geer in 1775, originally under the genus Cerambyx. It has a wide distribution throughout Europe.

== Subspecies ==
- Pogonocherus fasciculatus fasciculatus (DeGeer, 1775)
- Pogonocherus fasciculatus hondoensis Ohbayashi, 1963
