= Agapanthia dahli ismailovae =

Scientific classification
- Kingdom: Animalia
- Phylum: Arthropoda
- Class: Insecta
- Order: Coleoptera
- Suborder: Polyphaga
- Infraorder: Cucujiformia
- Family: Cerambycidae
- Genus: Agapanthia
- Species: A. dahli
- Subspecies: A. d. ismailovae

Trinomial name
- Agapanthia dahli ismailovae Lazarev, 2013

Subspecies of beetle

Agapanthia dahli ismailovae is a subspecies of beetle in the family Cerambycidae. It was described by Lazarev in 2013. It is known from Russia and Azerbaijan. The taxon is dedicated to Madina Ismailova, who collected the most part of the series.

== Name ==
Agapanthia (Epoptes) dahli ismailovae Lazarev, 2013: 446

Type locality: North Caucasus, Dagestan, Rutul environs.

Holotype: Coll. Danilevsky. male, Dagestan, Rutul env., 24.6.2001, M. Ismailova leg.
