= Agapanthia dahli olegpaki =

Scientific classification
- Kingdom: Animalia
- Phylum: Arthropoda
- Class: Insecta
- Order: Coleoptera
- Suborder: Polyphaga
- Infraorder: Cucujiformia
- Family: Cerambycidae
- Genus: Agapanthia
- Species: A. dahli
- Subspecies: A. d. olegpaki

Trinomial name
- Agapanthia dahli olegpaki Lazarev, 2025

Subspecies of beetle

Agapanthia dahli olegpaki is a subspecies of beetle in the family Cerambycidae. It was described by Lazarev in 2025. It is known from Kazakhstan. The taxon is dedicated to Oleg Pak (Donetsk-city).

== Name ==
Agapanthia (Epoptes) dahli olegpaki Lazarev, 2025: 623

Type locality: Kazakhstan, N slope of Tarbagatai Mt., Maylyshat env., 47°47′20″N 81°44′49″E.

Holotype: Coll. Lazarev. male, Kazakhstan, N slope of Tarbagatai Mt., Maylyshat env.,47°47′20″N 81°44′49″E, 10.6.2025, O. Pak leg.

== Description ==
The species exhibits slight sexual dimorphism in size, with females being marginally larger than males. The males reach a body length of 13.8 mm and a width of 3.4 mm, while the females measure approximately 14.3 mm in length and 3.6 mm in width.
