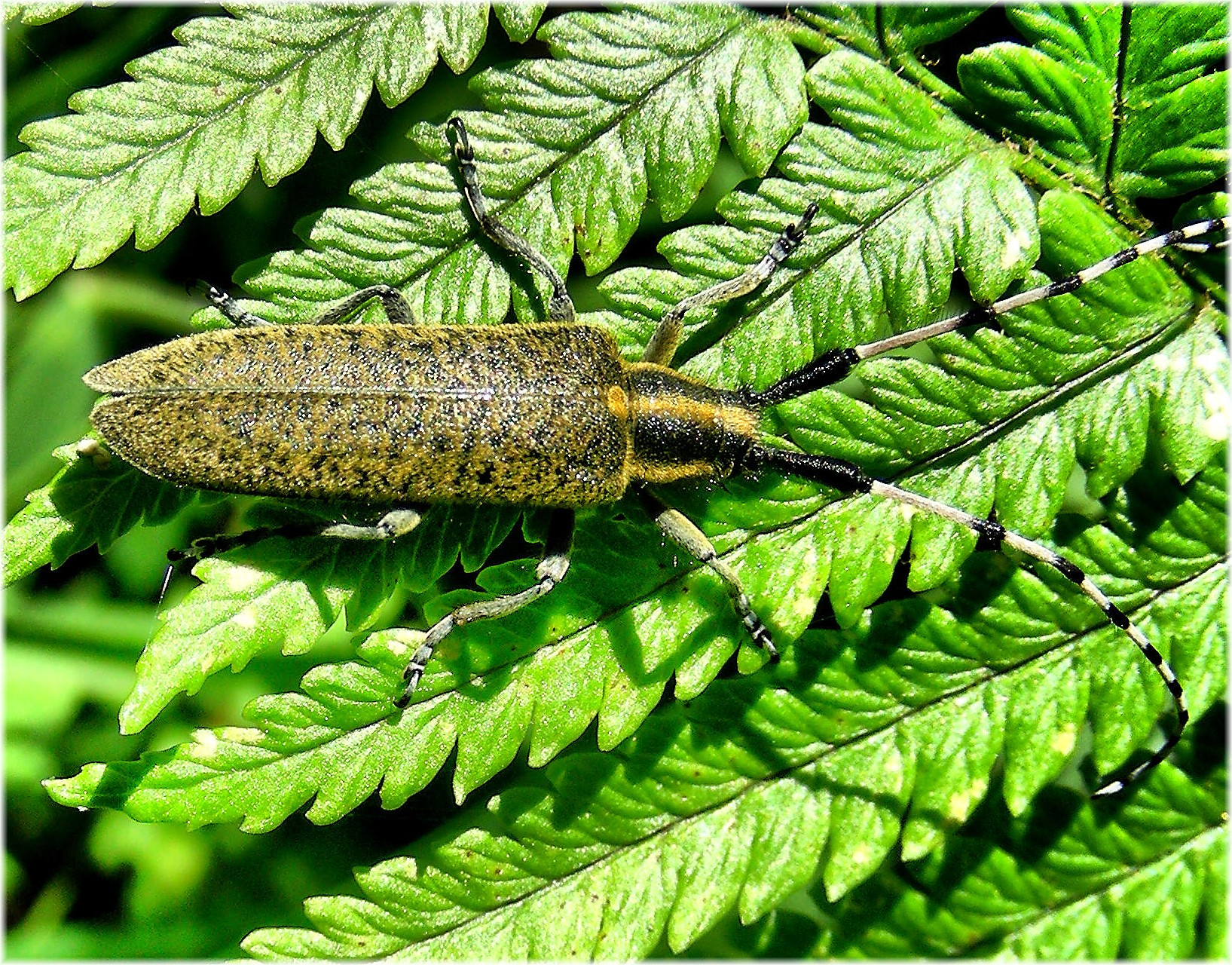
- Agapanthia asphodeli

Scientific classification
- Kingdom: Animalia
- Phylum: Arthropoda
- Class: Insecta
- Order: Coleoptera
- Suborder: Polyphaga
- Infraorder: Cucujiformia
- Family: Cerambycidae
- Genus: Agapanthia
- Species: A. asphodeli

Binomial name
- Agapanthia asphodeli Latreille, 1804

Synonyms
- Agapanthia asphodeli var. mimica Pic, 1927; Agapanthia insularis Gautier, 1870; Agapanthia reyi Mulsant & Godard, 1870; Epoptes asphodeli (Latreille) Gistl, 1857; Lamia asphodeli Latreille, 1804; Saperda spencei Gyllenhal, 1817

= Agapanthia asphodeli =

Species of beetle

Agapanthia asphodeli is a species of beetle in the family Cerambycidae found in Algeria, Central, Eastern and Western Europe, Tunisia and Turkey. Just like its cousin Agapanthia villosoviridescens, the species is brown coloured and has yellow lines along the elytron.
