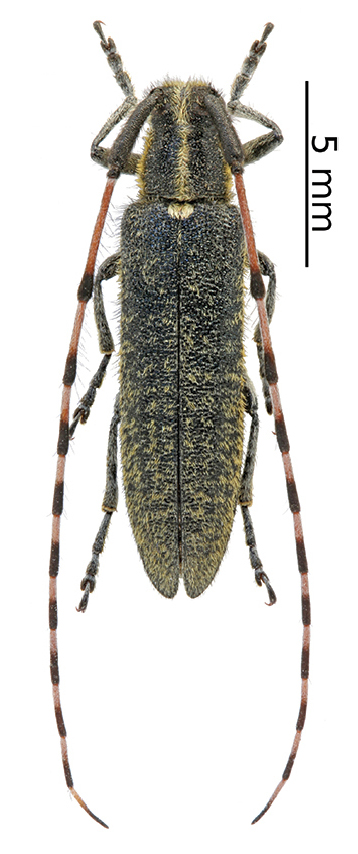
- Agapanthia dahli calculensis (male, Kazakhstan)

Scientific classification
- Kingdom: Animalia
- Phylum: Arthropoda
- Class: Insecta
- Order: Coleoptera
- Suborder: Polyphaga
- Infraorder: Cucujiformia
- Family: Cerambycidae
- Genus: Agapanthia
- Species: A. dahli
- Subspecies: A. d. calculensis

Trinomial name
- Agapanthia dahli calculensis Lazarev, 2013

= Agapanthia dahli calculensis =

Subspecies of beetle

Agapanthia dahli calculensis is a subspecies of beetle in the family Cerambycidae. It was described by Lazarev in 2013. It is known from North-east Kazakhstan (Sibinka river, ). Named according living among small stones “Calculensis”.
