= Agapanthia frivaldszkyi =

Scientific classification
- Kingdom: Animalia
- Phylum: Arthropoda
- Clade: Pancrustacea
- Class: Insecta
- Order: Coleoptera
- Suborder: Polyphaga
- Infraorder: Cucujiformia
- Family: Cerambycidae
- Genus: Agapanthia
- Species: A. frivaldszkyi

Binomial name
- Agapanthia frivaldszkyi Ganglbauer, 1884

Species of beetle

Agapanthia frivaldszkyi is a species of beetle in the subfamily Lamiinae, found in Syria and Turkey. Adults are 8–13 millimetres (0.31–0.51 in) in length and are black coloured.
