= Agapanthia obydovi =

Scientific classification
- Kingdom: Animalia
- Phylum: Arthropoda
- Class: Insecta
- Order: Coleoptera
- Suborder: Polyphaga
- Infraorder: Cucujiformia
- Family: Cerambycidae
- Genus: Agapanthia
- Species: A. obydovi

Binomial name
- Agapanthia obydovi Danilevsky, 2000

Species of beetle

Agapanthia obydovi is a species of longhorn beetle in the subfamily Lamiinae found only in Kazakhstan.
