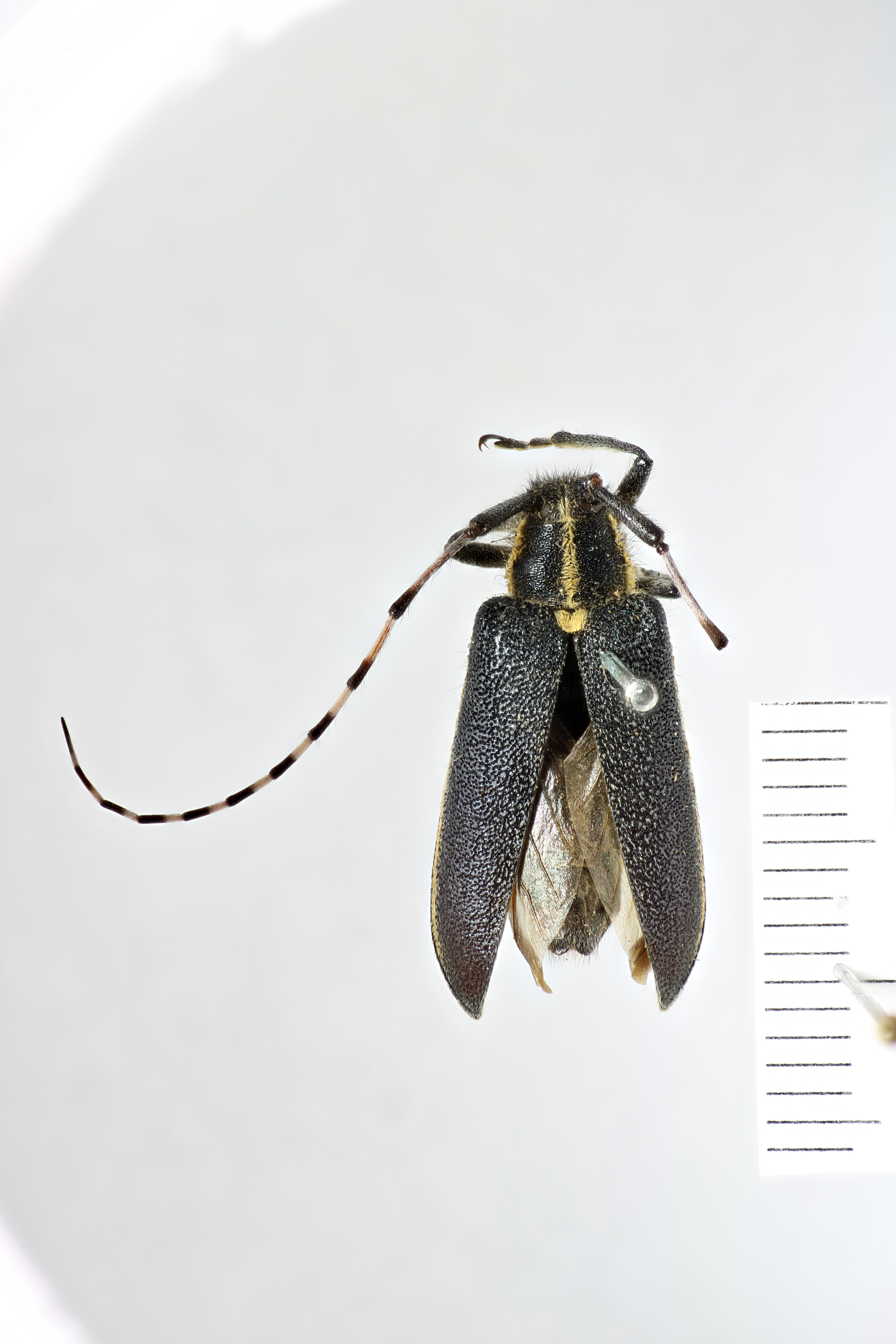

Scientific classification
- Kingdom: Animalia
- Phylum: Arthropoda
- Clade: Pancrustacea
- Class: Insecta
- Order: Coleoptera
- Suborder: Polyphaga
- Infraorder: Cucujiformia
- Family: Cerambycidae
- Genus: Agapanthia
- Species: A. nigriventris

Binomial name
- Agapanthia nigriventris Waterhall, 1889

= Agapanthia nigriventris =

Species of beetle

Agapanthia nigriventris is a species of beetle in the family Cerambycidae. It was described by Waterhall in 1889.
