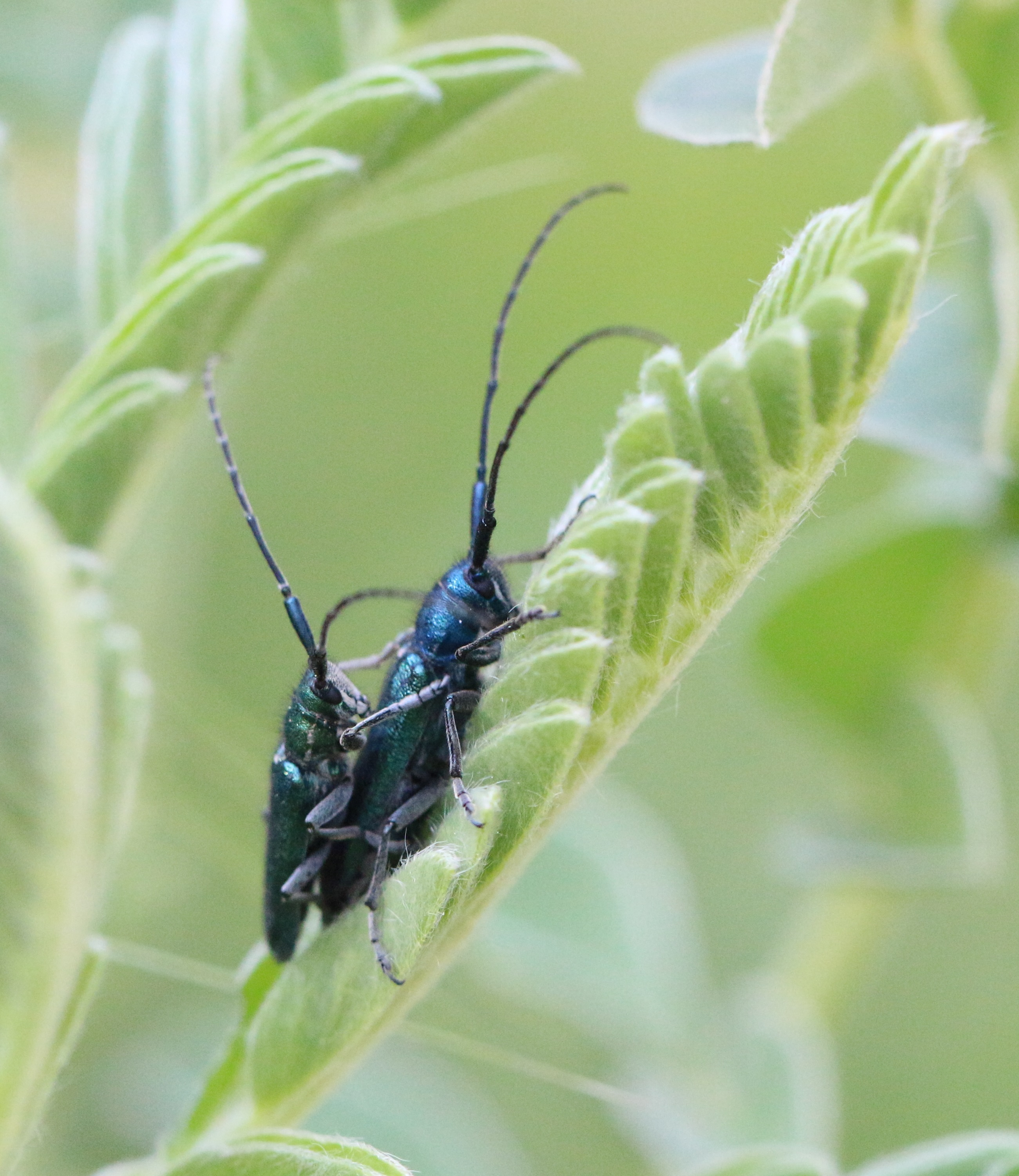

Scientific classification
- Kingdom: Animalia
- Phylum: Arthropoda
- Class: Insecta
- Order: Coleoptera
- Suborder: Polyphaga
- Infraorder: Cucujiformia
- Family: Cerambycidae
- Genus: Agapanthia
- Species: A. lais

Binomial name
- Agapanthia lais Reiche, 1858

= Agapanthia lais =

Species of beetle

Agapanthia lais is a species of beetle in the family Cerambycidae. It was described by Reiche in 1858.
