= Agapanthia alaiensis =

Scientific classification
- Kingdom: Animalia
- Phylum: Arthropoda
- Class: Insecta
- Order: Coleoptera
- Suborder: Polyphaga
- Infraorder: Cucujiformia
- Family: Cerambycidae
- Genus: Agapanthia
- Species: A. alaiensis

Binomial name
- Agapanthia alaiensis Kratochvíl, 1985

Species of beetle

Agapanthia alaiensis is a species of beetle in the family Cerambycidae. It was described by Kratochvíl in 1985.
