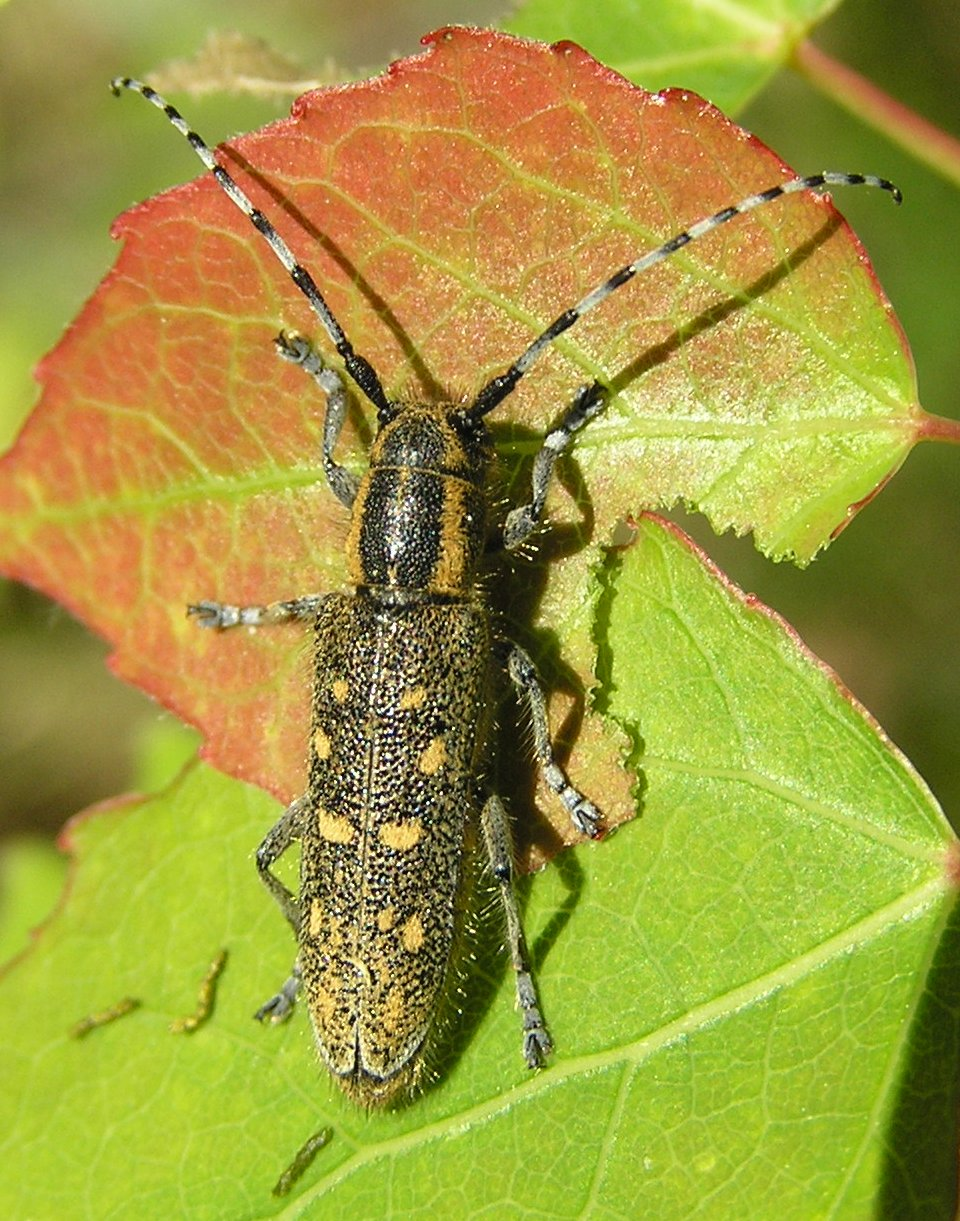

Scientific classification
- Kingdom: Animalia
- Phylum: Arthropoda
- Clade: Pancrustacea
- Class: Insecta
- Order: Coleoptera
- Suborder: Polyphaga
- Infraorder: Cucujiformia
- Family: Cerambycidae
- Genus: Saperda
- Species: S. populnea

Binomial name
- Saperda populnea (Linnaeus, 1758)

Synonyms
- Cerambyx decempunctatus DeGeer, 1775; Cerambyx populneus Linnaeus, 1758; Compsidia populnea (Linnaeus, 1758); Lamia populnea (Linnaeus, 1758; Leptura betulina Geoffroy, 1785

= Saperda populnea =

Species of beetle

Saperda populnea, the small poplar borer, is a species of beetle in the family Cerambycidae which forms woody galls on twigs of poplars and willows. It was described by Carl Linnaeus in 1758.

== Description ==
It is a medium-sized (9–15 mm), slender, dark longhorn beetle.The body is cylindrical with dark, protruding hairs. The antennae are shorter than the body, each segment two-toned with a grayish inner part and a black outer part. The head has a grey-yellow marking on the forehead shaped like an upside-down V. The pronotum is rectangular from above, slightly wider than long, with grey-yellow stripes on the sides. The elytra are parallel-sided, only slightly wider than the pronotum, grey-yellow, densely covered with dark spots except for some areas left as light spots, usually four on each wing. The legs are grey-brown.It resembles Agapanthia villosoviridescens but is much more robust and also lives in a different habitat. The beetles can be found from May to July, when the female makes a horseshoe shaped cut and laying an egg in the incision. The gall develops in an internode as a symmetrical swelling, which can be 20 mm long, and contains a yellowish larva or pupa in a single elongate chamber. An exit hole is made in the spring. It is most common on aspen (Populus tremula) and also found on black cottonwood (P. trichocarpa), black poplar (P. nigra) and goat willow (Salix caprea). In Britain the gall is commonest on the young twigs of aspen.

== Distribution ==
Has been recorded in the following countries, Albania, Algeria, Austria, Belarus, Belgium, Bosnia and Herzegovina, Bulgaria, Canada, China, Croatia, Czech Republic (Bohemia, Moravia), France, Germany, Hungary, Italy, Japan, Kazakhstan, Luxembourg, Mongolia, Morocco, Mexico, North Korea, Poland, Romania, Russia, Sardinia, Serbia, Sicily, Slovakia, Slovenia, Spain, Sweden, Norway, Switzerland, Turkey, United Kingdom, United States of America.
