= Agapanthia alexandris =

Scientific classification
- Kingdom: Animalia
- Phylum: Arthropoda
- Class: Insecta
- Order: Coleoptera
- Suborder: Polyphaga
- Infraorder: Cucujiformia
- Family: Cerambycidae
- Genus: Agapanthia
- Species: A. alexandris

Binomial name
- Agapanthia alexandris Pic, 1901

Species of beetle

Agapanthia alexandris is a species of beetle in the family Cerambycidae. It was described by Maurice Pic in 1901.
