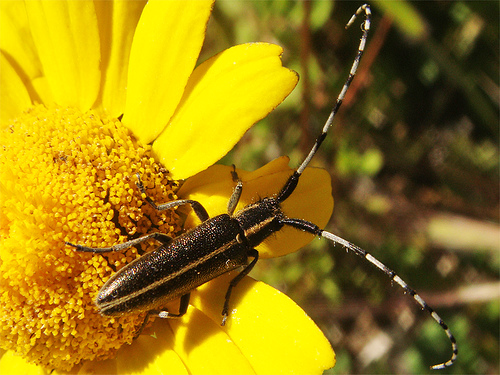
- Agapanthia suturalis

Scientific classification
- Kingdom: Animalia
- Phylum: Arthropoda
- Clade: Pancrustacea
- Class: Insecta
- Order: Coleoptera
- Suborder: Polyphaga
- Infraorder: Cucujiformia
- Family: Cerambycidae
- Genus: Agapanthia
- Species: A. suturalis

Binomial name
- Agapanthia suturalis (Fabricius, 1787)

Synonyms
- Agapanthia cardui ruficornis (Pic) Pesarini & Sabbadini, 2004; Agapanthia cardui var. ruficornis Pic, 1918; Saperda suturalis Fabricius, 1787

= Agapanthia suturalis =

Species of beetle

Agapanthia suturalis is a species of beetle in the subfamily Lamiinae, found in Sicily, Spain, the Near East, North Africa and Turkey. The species is black coloured with a yellow stripe. Males are larger than females. They fly from May to June. They are known to bore into Knautia arvensis stems.
