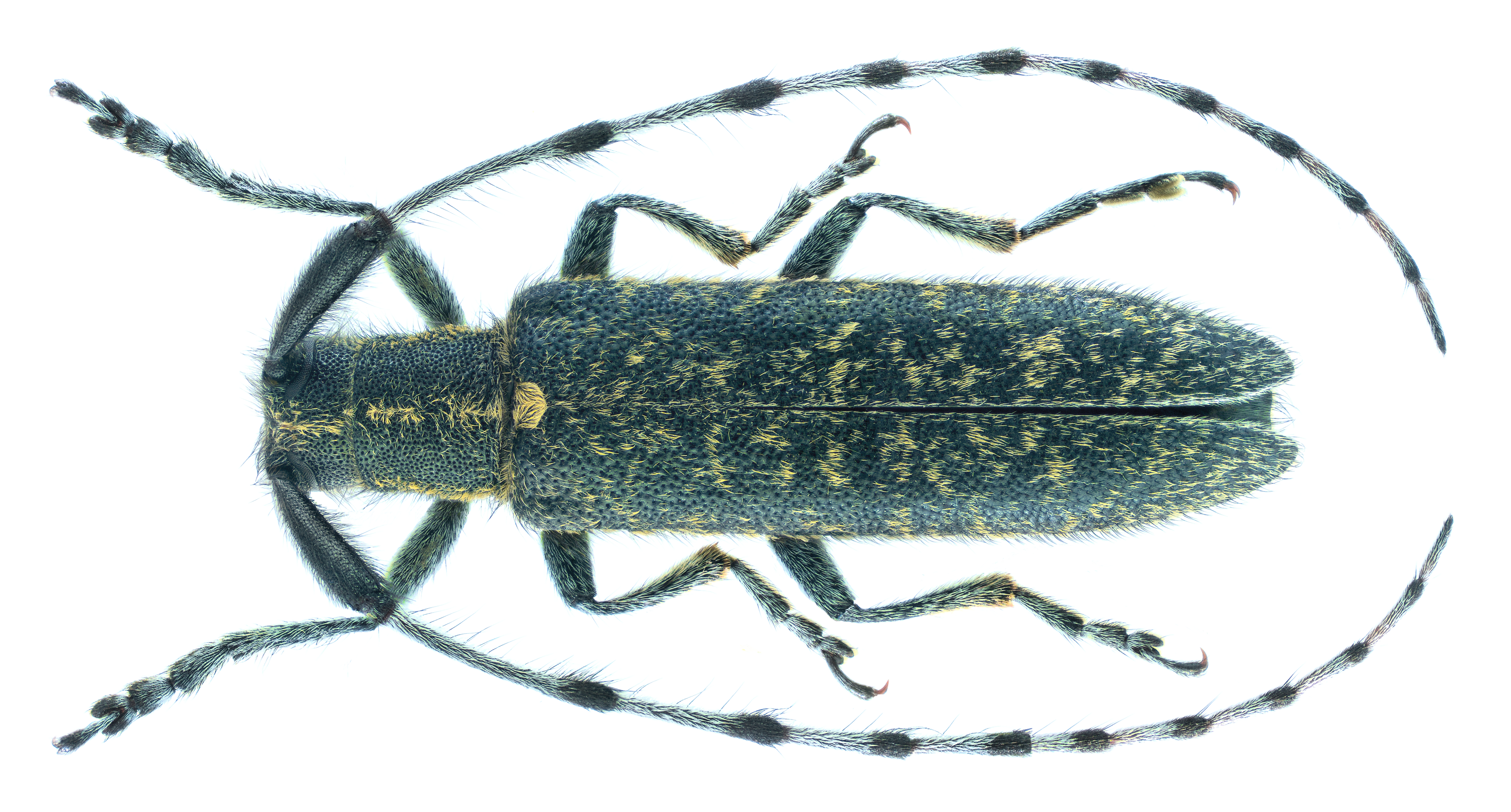

Scientific classification
- Kingdom: Animalia
- Phylum: Arthropoda
- Class: Insecta
- Order: Coleoptera
- Suborder: Polyphaga
- Infraorder: Cucujiformia
- Family: Cerambycidae
- Genus: Agapanthia
- Species: A. daurica

Binomial name
- Agapanthia daurica Ganglbauer, 1884

= Agapanthia daurica =

Species of beetle

Agapanthia daurica is a species of beetle in the family Cerambycidae. It was described by Ludwig Ganglbauer in 1883.
