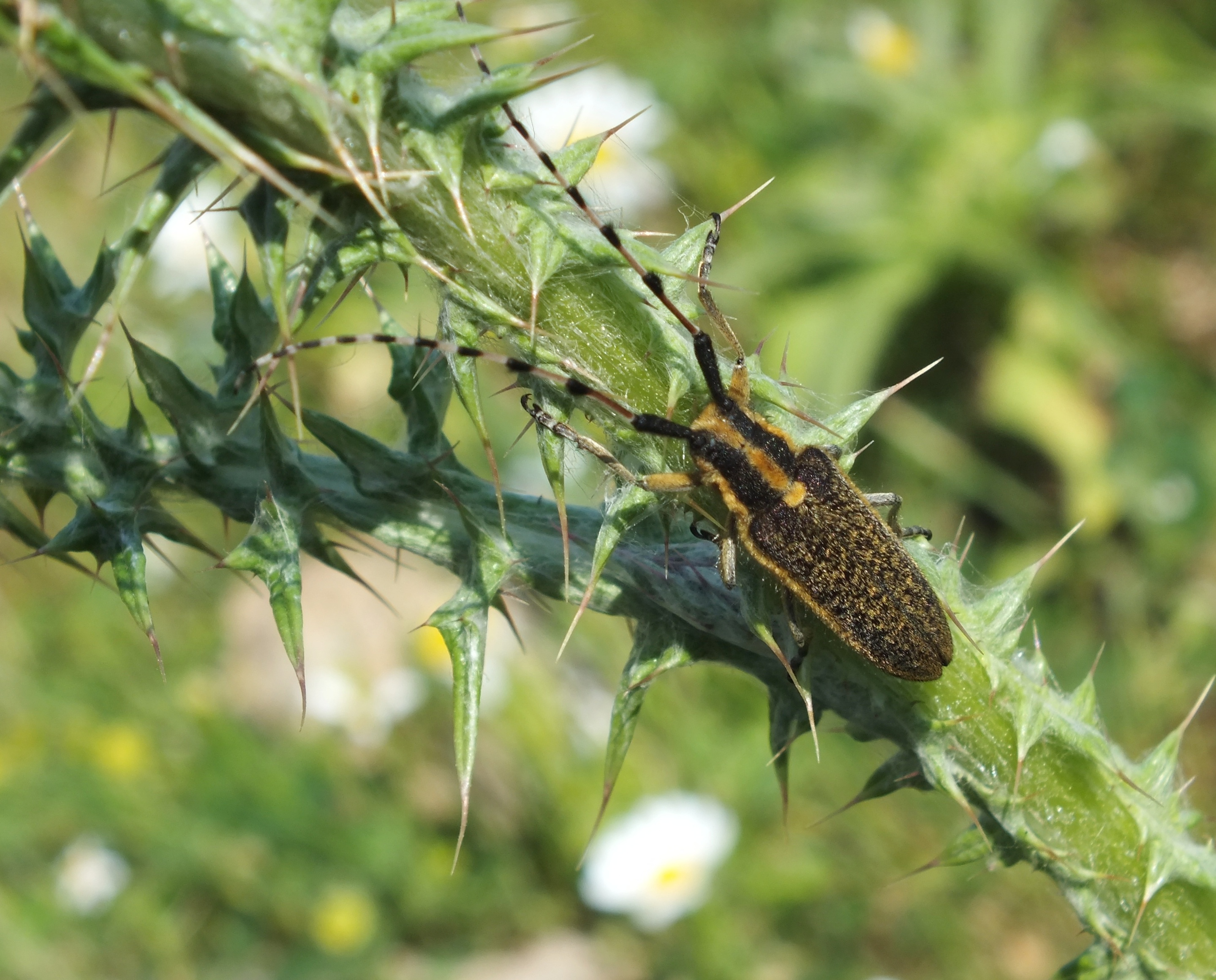

Scientific classification
- Kingdom: Animalia
- Phylum: Arthropoda
- Class: Insecta
- Order: Coleoptera
- Suborder: Polyphaga
- Infraorder: Cucujiformia
- Family: Cerambycidae
- Genus: Agapanthia
- Species: A. nicosiensis

Binomial name
- Agapanthia nicosiensis Pic, 1927

= Agapanthia nicosiensis =

Species of beetle

Agapanthia nicosiensis is a species of beetle in the family Cerambycidae. It was described by Maurice Pic in 1927.
