= Agapanthia gemella =

Scientific classification
- Kingdom: Animalia
- Phylum: Arthropoda
- Class: Insecta
- Order: Coleoptera
- Suborder: Polyphaga
- Infraorder: Cucujiformia
- Family: Cerambycidae
- Genus: Agapanthia
- Species: A. gemella

Binomial name
- Agapanthia gemella Holzschuh, 1989

Species of beetle

Agapanthia gemella is a species of beetle in the subfamily Lamiinae endemic to Cyprus. It was described by the German entomologist Carolus Holzschuh in 1989 and is placed in the subgenus Smaragdula. The species is 8–12 millimetres (0.3–0.5 in) long and metallic green with no blue tinge. It endemic to Cyprus, where it has been recorded from Paphos and Limassol districts. The beetles feed on Fabaceae species, particularly Erophaca baetica orientalis, with their larvae developing in the stalks of these plants.

== Taxonomy ==
Agapanthia gemella was described by the German entomologist Carolus Holzschuh in 1989 based on a female specimen collected from Limassol, Cyprus in 1980. It is placed in the subgenus Smaragdula.

== Description ==
The species is 8–12 millimetres (0.3–0.5 in) long. It is metallic green with no blue tinge. The species can be distinguished by its plump body, the transverse wrinkles on its neck shield, and the long and dense hairs on the elytra.

== Distribution ==
The beetle is endemic to Cyprus, where it has been recorded from Paphos and Limassol districts. It is found at elevations of up to 1000 m.

== Ecology ==
The beetles feed on Fabaceae species, particularly Erophaca baetica orientalis. Adults are visible from late March to early June and feed on flowers and young leaves. Larvae develop in the stocks of E. b. orientalis, removing the bark from just above ground level at the end of development. The stalk then falls off and the larvae pupate in the cut-off portion.
