= Agapanthia talassica =

Scientific classification
- Kingdom: Animalia
- Phylum: Arthropoda
- Class: Insecta
- Order: Coleoptera
- Suborder: Polyphaga
- Infraorder: Cucujiformia
- Family: Cerambycidae
- Genus: Agapanthia
- Species: A. talassica

Binomial name
- Agapanthia talassica Kostin, 1973

Species of beetle

Agapanthia talassica is a species of longhorn beetle in the subfamily Lamiinae found only in Kazakhstan.
