= Agapanthia incerta =

Scientific classification
- Kingdom: Animalia
- Phylum: Arthropoda
- Class: Insecta
- Order: Coleoptera
- Suborder: Polyphaga
- Infraorder: Cucujiformia
- Family: Cerambycidae
- Genus: Agapanthia
- Species: A. incerta

Binomial name
- Agapanthia incerta Plavilstshikov, 1930

Species of beetle

Agapanthia incerta is a species of beetle in the family Cerambycidae. It was described by Plavilstshikov in 1930.
