= Agapanthia zappii =

Scientific classification
- Kingdom: Animalia
- Phylum: Arthropoda
- Class: Insecta
- Order: Coleoptera
- Suborder: Polyphaga
- Infraorder: Cucujiformia
- Family: Cerambycidae
- Genus: Agapanthia
- Species: A. zappii

Binomial name
- Agapanthia zappii Sama, 1987

Species of beetle

Agapanthia zappii is a species of beetle in the family Cerambycidae. It was described by Sama in 1987.
