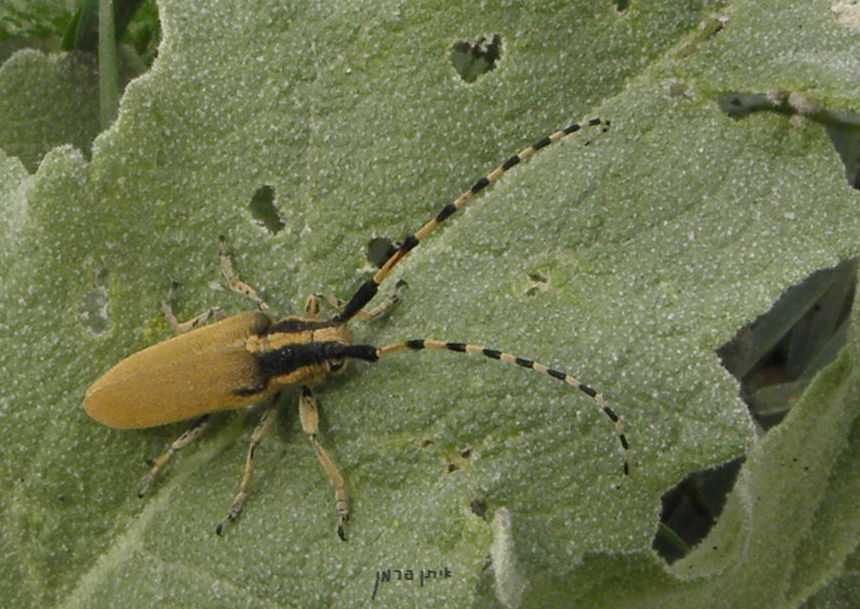

Scientific classification
- Kingdom: Animalia
- Phylum: Arthropoda
- Class: Insecta
- Order: Coleoptera
- Suborder: Polyphaga
- Infraorder: Cucujiformia
- Family: Cerambycidae
- Genus: Agapanthia
- Species: A. kirbyi

Binomial name
- Agapanthia kirbyi (Gyllenhal, 1817)

= Agapanthia kirbyi =

Species of beetle

Agapanthia kirbyi is a species of beetle in the family Cerambycidae. It was described by Gyllenhal in 1817.
