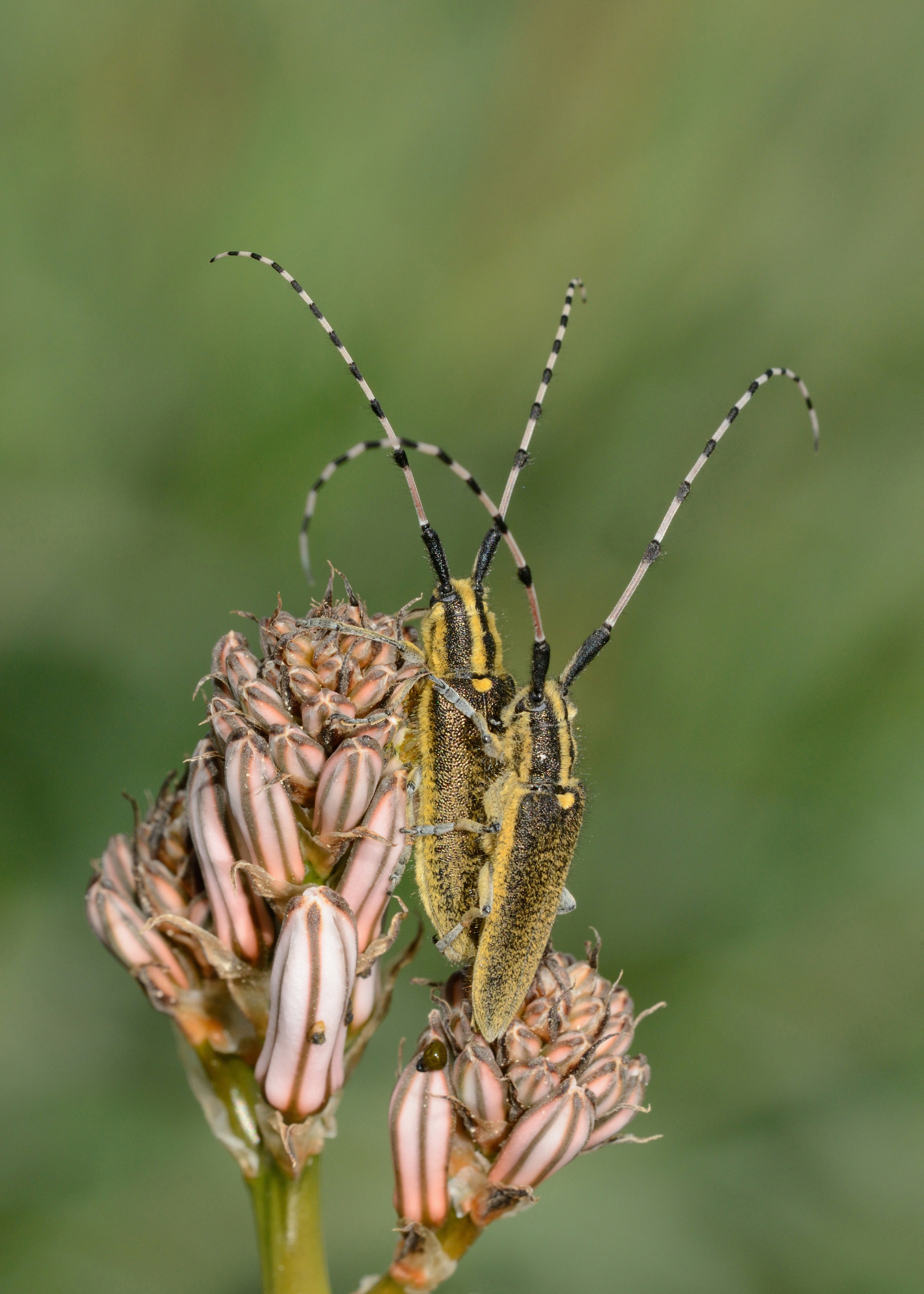
- Mating on flower buds of Asphodelus ramosus, Nahal Shikma Reserve, Israel.

Scientific classification
- Kingdom: Animalia
- Phylum: Arthropoda
- Class: Insecta
- Order: Coleoptera
- Suborder: Polyphaga
- Infraorder: Cucujiformia
- Family: Cerambycidae
- Genus: Agapanthia
- Species: A. pustulifera

Binomial name
- Agapanthia pustulifera Pic, 1905

= Agapanthia pustulifera =

Species of beetle

Agapanthia pustulifera is a species of longhorn beetle in the subfamily Lamiinae found in Near East as Israel, Syria, Jordan. Agapanthia pustulifera's life cycle lasts 1 year. This beetle is approximately 13–19 millimetres (0.51–0.75 in) in length.
