= Agapanthia auliensis =

Scientific classification
- Kingdom: Animalia
- Phylum: Arthropoda
- Class: Insecta
- Order: Coleoptera
- Suborder: Polyphaga
- Infraorder: Cucujiformia
- Family: Cerambycidae
- Genus: Agapanthia
- Species: A. auliensis

Binomial name
- Agapanthia auliensis Pic, 1907

Species of beetle

Agapanthia auliensis is a species of beetle in the family Cerambycidae. It was described by Maurice Pic in 1907.
