= Agapanthia japonica =

Scientific classification
- Kingdom: Animalia
- Phylum: Arthropoda
- Clade: Pancrustacea
- Class: Insecta
- Order: Coleoptera
- Suborder: Polyphaga
- Infraorder: Cucujiformia
- Family: Cerambycidae
- Genus: Agapanthia
- Species: A. japonica

Binomial name
- Agapanthia japonica Kano, 1933

Species of beetle

Agapanthia japonica is a species of beetle in the family Cerambycidae. It was described by Kano in 1933.
