= Agapanthia persicola =

Scientific classification
- Kingdom: Animalia
- Phylum: Arthropoda
- Class: Insecta
- Order: Coleoptera
- Suborder: Polyphaga
- Infraorder: Cucujiformia
- Family: Cerambycidae
- Genus: Agapanthia
- Species: A. persicola

Binomial name
- Agapanthia persicola Reitter, 1894

Species of beetle

Agapanthia persicola is a species of beetle in the subfamily Lamiinae endemic to Iran. The species is 7–12 millimetres (0.28–0.47 in) in length, and are blue coloured. The flight time is from May to June, with a life cycle of one year.
