= Agapanthia verecunda =

Scientific classification
- Kingdom: Animalia
- Phylum: Arthropoda
- Class: Insecta
- Order: Coleoptera
- Suborder: Polyphaga
- Infraorder: Cucujiformia
- Family: Cerambycidae
- Genus: Agapanthia
- Species: A. verecunda

Binomial name
- Agapanthia verecunda Chevrolat, 1882

Species of beetle

Agapanthia verecunda is a species of beetle in the family Cerambycidae. It was described by Louis Alexandre Auguste Chevrolat in 1882.
