= Agapanthia probsti =

Conservation status
- Least Concern (IUCN 3.1)

Scientific classification
- Kingdom: Animalia
- Phylum: Arthropoda
- Class: Insecta
- Order: Coleoptera
- Suborder: Polyphaga
- Infraorder: Cucujiformia
- Family: Cerambycidae
- Genus: Agapanthia
- Species: A. probsti

Binomial name
- Agapanthia probsti Holzschuh, 1984

Species of beetle

Agapanthia probsti is a species of beetle in the family Cerambycidae. It was described by Holzschuh in 1984.
