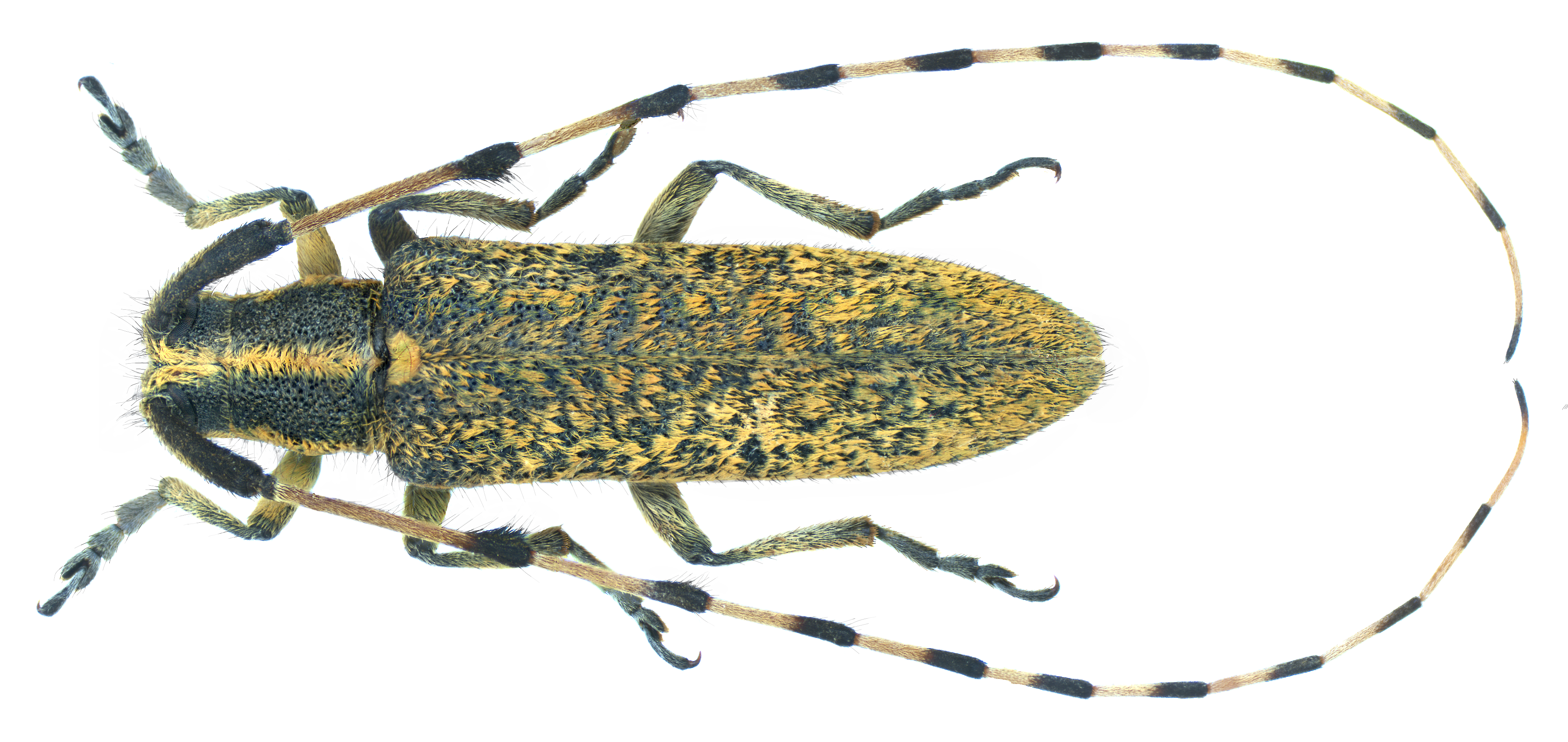

Scientific classification
- Kingdom: Animalia
- Phylum: Arthropoda
- Clade: Pancrustacea
- Class: Insecta
- Order: Coleoptera
- Suborder: Polyphaga
- Infraorder: Cucujiformia
- Family: Cerambycidae
- Genus: Agapanthia
- Species: A. persica

Binomial name
- Agapanthia persica Semenov, 1893

= Agapanthia persica =

Species of beetle

Agapanthia persica is a species of beetle in the family Cerambycidae. It was described by Semenov in 1893.
