= Agapanthia korostelevi =

Scientific classification
- Kingdom: Animalia
- Phylum: Arthropoda
- Class: Insecta
- Order: Coleoptera
- Suborder: Polyphaga
- Infraorder: Cucujiformia
- Family: Cerambycidae
- Genus: Agapanthia
- Species: A. korostelevi

Binomial name
- Agapanthia korostelevi Danilevsky, 1985

Species of beetle

Agapanthia korostelevi is a species of beetle in the family Cerambycidae. It was described by Mikhail Leontievich Danilevsky in 1985.
