= Agapanthia boeberi =

Scientific classification
- Kingdom: Animalia
- Phylum: Arthropoda
- Class: Insecta
- Order: Coleoptera
- Suborder: Polyphaga
- Infraorder: Cucujiformia
- Family: Cerambycidae
- Genus: Agapanthia
- Species: A. boeberi

Binomial name
- Agapanthia boeberi (Fischer von Walheim, 1806)

Synonyms
- Saperda boeberi Fischer von Waldheim, 1806

Species of beetle

Agapanthia boeberi is a species of longhorn beetle in the subfamily Lamiinae that are endemic to Lebanon.
