= Agapanthia orbachi =

Scientific classification
- Kingdom: Animalia
- Phylum: Arthropoda
- Class: Insecta
- Order: Coleoptera
- Suborder: Polyphaga
- Infraorder: Cucujiformia
- Family: Cerambycidae
- Genus: Agapanthia
- Species: A. orbachi

Binomial name
- Agapanthia orbachi Sama, 1993

Species of beetle

Agapanthia orbachi is a species of beetle in the family Cerambycidae. It was described by Sama in 1993.
