= Agapanthia yagii =

Scientific classification
- Kingdom: Animalia
- Phylum: Arthropoda
- Class: Insecta
- Order: Coleoptera
- Suborder: Polyphaga
- Infraorder: Cucujiformia
- Family: Cerambycidae
- Genus: Agapanthia
- Species: A. yagii

Binomial name
- Agapanthia yagii Hayashi, 1982

Species of beetle

Agapanthia yagii is a species of beetle in the family Cerambycidae. It was described by Hayashi in 1982.
