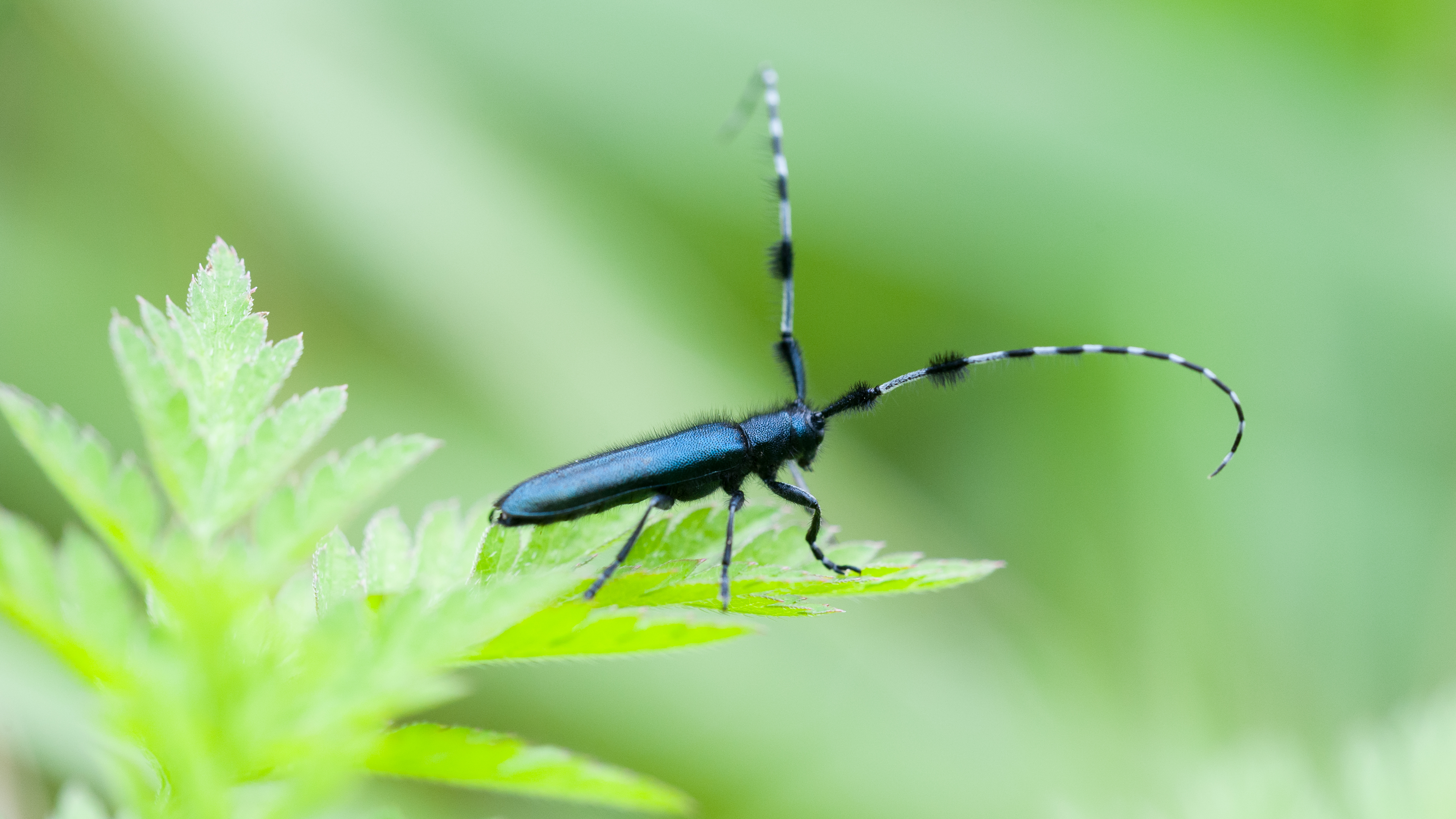
- Agapanthia pilicornis on a leaf

Scientific classification
- Kingdom: Animalia
- Phylum: Arthropoda
- Clade: Pancrustacea
- Class: Insecta
- Order: Coleoptera
- Suborder: Polyphaga
- Infraorder: Cucujiformia
- Family: Cerambycidae
- Genus: Agapanthia
- Species: A. pilicornis

Binomial name
- Agapanthia pilicornis Fabricius, 1787

= Agapanthia pilicornis =

Species of beetle

Agapanthia pilicornis is a species of beetle in the family Cerambycidae. It was described by Johan Christian Fabricius in 1787.
