= Agapanthia fallax =

Scientific classification
- Kingdom: Animalia
- Phylum: Arthropoda
- Class: Insecta
- Order: Coleoptera
- Suborder: Polyphaga
- Infraorder: Cucujiformia
- Family: Cerambycidae
- Genus: Agapanthia
- Species: A. fallax

Binomial name
- Agapanthia fallax Holzschuh, 1973

Species of beetle

Agapanthia fallax is a species of beetle in the family Cerambycidae. It was described by Holzschuh in 1973.
