= Agapanthia angelicae =

Scientific classification
- Kingdom: Animalia
- Phylum: Arthropoda
- Class: Insecta
- Order: Coleoptera
- Suborder: Polyphaga
- Infraorder: Cucujiformia
- Family: Cerambycidae
- Genus: Agapanthia
- Species: A. angelicae

Binomial name
- Agapanthia angelicae Reitter, 1898

Synonyms
- Agapanthia bilateralis Pic, 1927; Agapanthia hauseri Reitter, 1901

Species of beetle

Agapanthia angelicae is a species of longhorn beetle in the subfamily Lamiinae, found in Central Asia and Iran. The species is 12–18 millimetres (0.47–0.71 in) long and is black coloured. Adults are on wing from May to June. They feed on Ferula hermonis.
