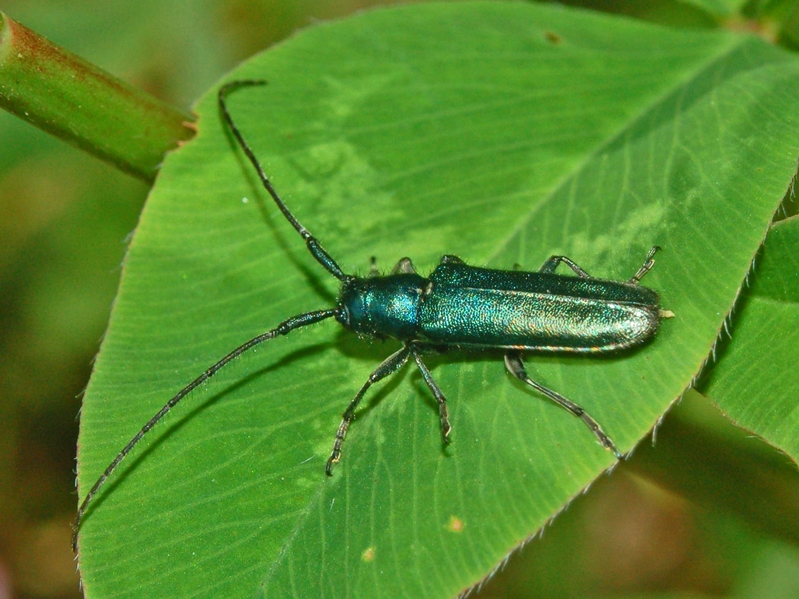

Scientific classification
- Kingdom: Animalia
- Phylum: Arthropoda
- Class: Insecta
- Order: Coleoptera
- Suborder: Polyphaga
- Infraorder: Cucujiformia
- Family: Cerambycidae
- Genus: Agapanthia
- Species: A. violacea

Binomial name
- Agapanthia violacea (Fabricius, 1775)

Synonyms
- Agapanthia coerulea (Mulsant, 1839); Agapanthia cardui grossa (Pic, 1891); Agapanthia coerulea (Mulsant, 1839); Agapanthia micans (Mulsant, 1862); Cerambyx violacea var. alpina (Villiers, 1978); Cerambyx janthinus (Gmelin, 1790); Saperda caerulea (Schonherr, 1817); Saperda violacea (Fabricius, 1775)

= Agapanthia violacea =

Species of beetle

Agapanthia violacea is a species of flat-faced longhorn beetle belonging to the family Cerambycidae, subfamily Lamiinae.

This beetle is present in most Europe and in the Near East. The different coloration between male and female demonstrates the great variability of colours.

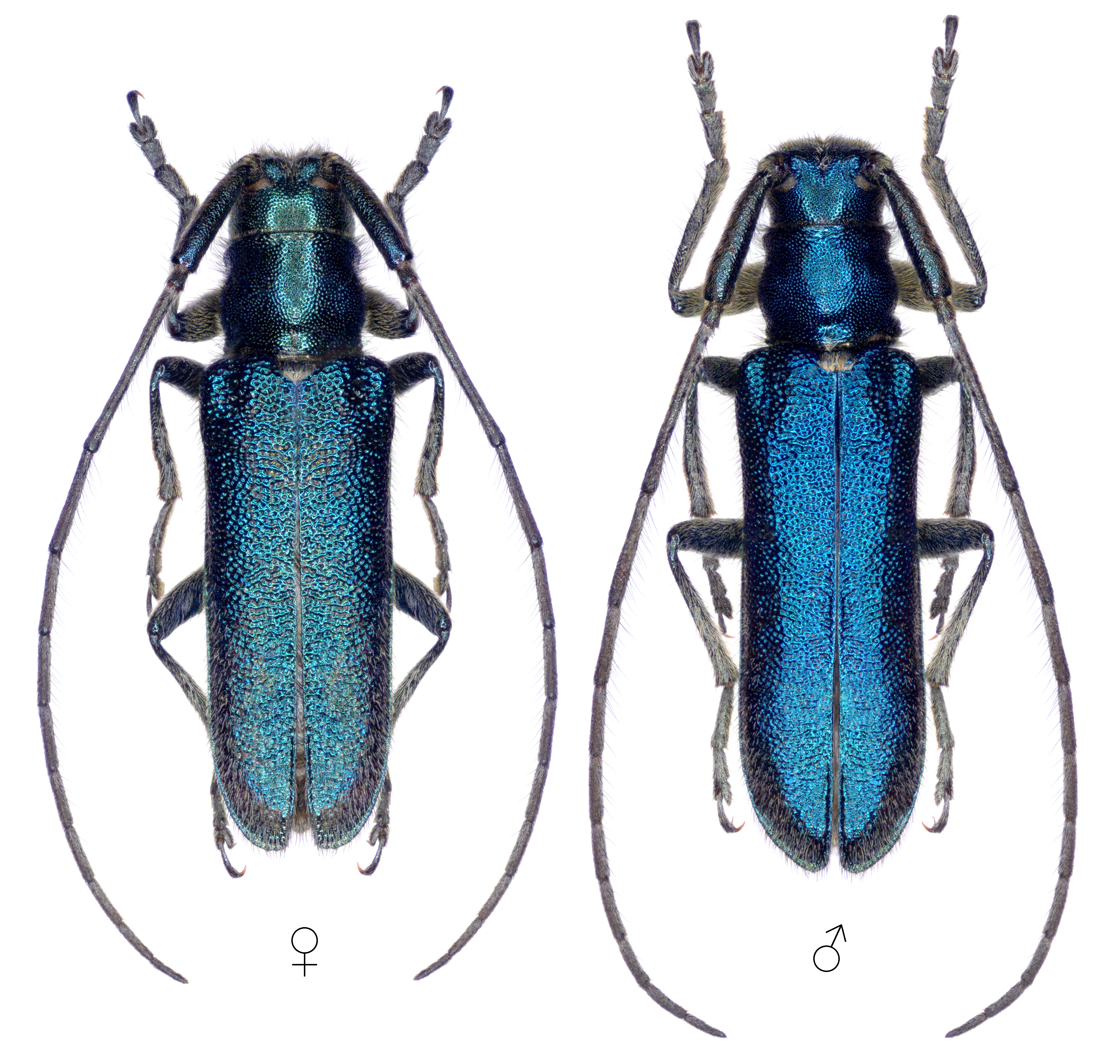
Male and female (Donetsk, Ukraine)

The adults grow up to 7–13 millimetres (0.28–0.51 in) and can be encountered from May through August, completing their life cycle in one year.

They are polyphagous on herbaceous plants, mainly feeding on Medicago sativa, Onobrychis viciifolia, Centranthus ruber, as well as on Scabiosa, Echium, Psoralea, Valeriana and Salvia species.
