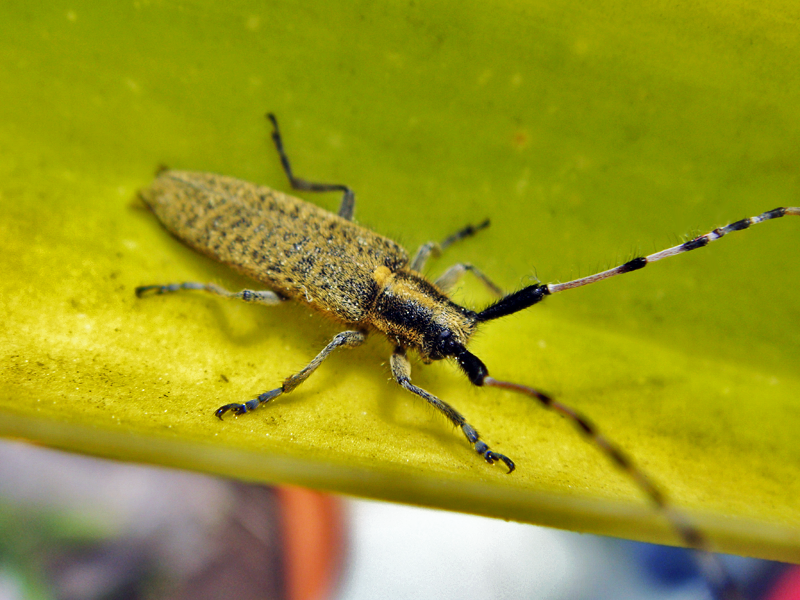

Scientific classification
- Kingdom: Animalia
- Phylum: Arthropoda
- Class: Insecta
- Order: Coleoptera
- Suborder: Polyphaga
- Infraorder: Cucujiformia
- Family: Cerambycidae
- Genus: Agapanthia
- Species: A. dahli

Binomial name
- Agapanthia dahli (Richter, 1821)

Synonyms
- Saperda nigricornis Fabricius, 1793 [HN]; Saperda dahli Richter, 1821; Agapanthia gyllenhali Ganglbauer, 1883

= Agapanthia dahli =

Species of beetle

Agapanthia dahli is a species of beetle in the family Cerambycidae. It was described by Richter in 1821.

== Subspecies ==
- Agapanthia dahli alaiensis Kratochvíl, 1985
- Agapanthia dahli alexandris Pic, 1901
- Agapanthia dahli calculensis Lazarev, 2013
- Agapanthia dahli dahli C. F. W. Richter, 1820
- Agapanthia dahli efimovi Danilevsky, 2021
- Agapanthia dahli golestanica Lazarev, Plewa & Jaworski, 2016
- Agapanthia dahli iliensis Danilevsky, 2018
- Agapanthia dahli ismailovae Lazarev, 2013
- Agapanthia dahli kuleshovi Danilevsky, 2018
- Agapanthia dahli lateralis Ganglbauer, 1884
- Agapanthia dahli lenkorana Lazarev, Plewa & Jaworski, 2016
- Agapanthia dahli lepsyensis Danilevsky, 2018d: 179
- Agapanthia dahli malmerendii Sama, 1981: 504
- Agapanthia dahli muellneri Reitter, 1898
- Agapanthia dahli mutinensium Sama & Rapuzzi, 2010
- Agapanthia dahli nitidipennis Holzschuh, 1984
- Agapanthia dahli olegpaki Lazarev, 2025
- Agapanthia dahli persica Semenov, 1893
- Agapanthia dahli pustulifera Pic, 1905
- Agapanthia dahli rubenyani Lazarev, 2013
- Agapanthia dahli salviae Holzschuh, 1975
- Agapanthia dahli schurmanni Sama, 1979
- Agapanthia dahli sicula Ganglbauer, 1884
- Agapanthia dahli subsimplicicornis Sama & Rapuzzi, 2010
- Agapanthia dahli transcaspica Pic, 1900
- Agapanthia dahli ustinovi Danilevsky, 2013
- Agapanthia dahli walteri Reitter, 1898
