= Agapanthia pesarinii =

Scientific classification
- Kingdom: Animalia
- Phylum: Arthropoda
- Class: Insecta
- Order: Coleoptera
- Suborder: Polyphaga
- Infraorder: Cucujiformia
- Family: Cerambycidae
- Genus: Agapanthia
- Species: A. pesarinii

Binomial name
- Agapanthia pesarinii Rapuzzi & Sama, 2010

Species of beetle

Agapanthia pesarinii is a species of beetle in the family Cerambycidae. It was described by Rapuzzi and Sama in 2010.
