= Agapanthia osmanlis =

Scientific classification
- Kingdom: Animalia
- Phylum: Arthropoda
- Class: Insecta
- Order: Coleoptera
- Suborder: Polyphaga
- Infraorder: Cucujiformia
- Family: Cerambycidae
- Genus: Agapanthia
- Species: A. osmanlis

Binomial name
- Agapanthia osmanlis Reiche & Saulcy, 1858

Species of beetle

Agapanthia osmanlis is a species of beetle in the family Cerambycidae. It was described by Reiche and Saulcy in 1858.
