= Agapanthia walteri =

Scientific classification
- Kingdom: Animalia
- Phylum: Arthropoda
- Class: Insecta
- Order: Coleoptera
- Suborder: Polyphaga
- Infraorder: Cucujiformia
- Family: Cerambycidae
- Genus: Agapanthia
- Species: A. walteri

Binomial name
- Agapanthia walteri Reitter, 1898

Species of beetle

Agapanthia walteri is a species of beetle in the family Cerambycidae. It was described by Reitter in 1898.
