= Agapanthia kindermanni =

Scientific classification
- Kingdom: Animalia
- Phylum: Arthropoda
- Class: Insecta
- Order: Coleoptera
- Suborder: Polyphaga
- Infraorder: Cucujiformia
- Family: Cerambycidae
- Genus: Agapanthia
- Species: A. kindermanni

Binomial name
- Agapanthia kindermanni Pic, 1905

Synonyms
- Agapanthia amicula Holzschuh, 1989

Species of beetle

Agapanthia kindermanni is a species of beetle in the family Cerambycidae. It was described by Maurice Pic in 1905. It is found in Turkey, including Hatay Province, İçel Province, Adana Province and Osmaniye Province.

It is 11–18 mm (0.43–0.71 in) long, lives for a year, and adults become mature around May–June.
