= Agapanthia subflavida =

Scientific classification
- Kingdom: Animalia
- Phylum: Arthropoda
- Clade: Pancrustacea
- Class: Insecta
- Order: Coleoptera
- Suborder: Polyphaga
- Infraorder: Cucujiformia
- Family: Cerambycidae
- Genus: Agapanthia
- Species: A. subflavida

Binomial name
- Agapanthia subflavida Pic, 1903

Species of beetle

Agapanthia subflavida is a species of beetle in the family Cerambycidae. It was described by Maurice Pic in 1903.
