= Agapanthia chalybaea =

Scientific classification
- Kingdom: Animalia
- Phylum: Arthropoda
- Class: Insecta
- Order: Coleoptera
- Suborder: Polyphaga
- Infraorder: Cucujiformia
- Family: Cerambycidae
- Genus: Agapanthia
- Species: A. chalybaea

Binomial name
- Agapanthia chalybaea Faldermann, 1837

Species of beetle

Agapanthia chalybaea is a species of beetle in the family Cerambycidae. It was described by Faldermann in 1837.
