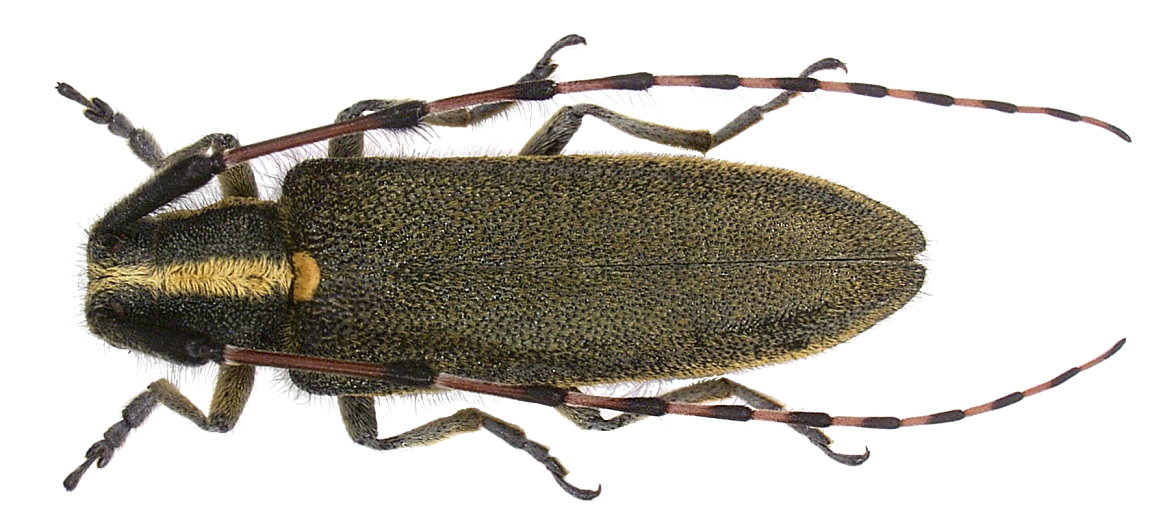

Scientific classification
- Kingdom: Animalia
- Phylum: Arthropoda
- Class: Insecta
- Order: Coleoptera
- Suborder: Polyphaga
- Infraorder: Cucujiformia
- Family: Cerambycidae
- Genus: Agapanthia
- Species: A. lateralis

Binomial name
- Agapanthia lateralis Ganglbauer, 1883

= Agapanthia lateralis =

Species of beetle

Agapanthia lateralis is a species of beetle in the family Cerambycidae. It was described by Ludwig Ganglbauer in 1883.
