= Agapanthia turanica =

Scientific classification
- Kingdom: Animalia
- Phylum: Arthropoda
- Class: Insecta
- Order: Coleoptera
- Suborder: Polyphaga
- Infraorder: Cucujiformia
- Family: Cerambycidae
- Genus: Agapanthia
- Species: A. turanica

Binomial name
- Agapanthia turanica Plavilstshikov, 1929

Species of beetle

Agapanthia turanica is a species of beetle in the family Cerambycidae. It was described by Plavilstshikov in 1929.
