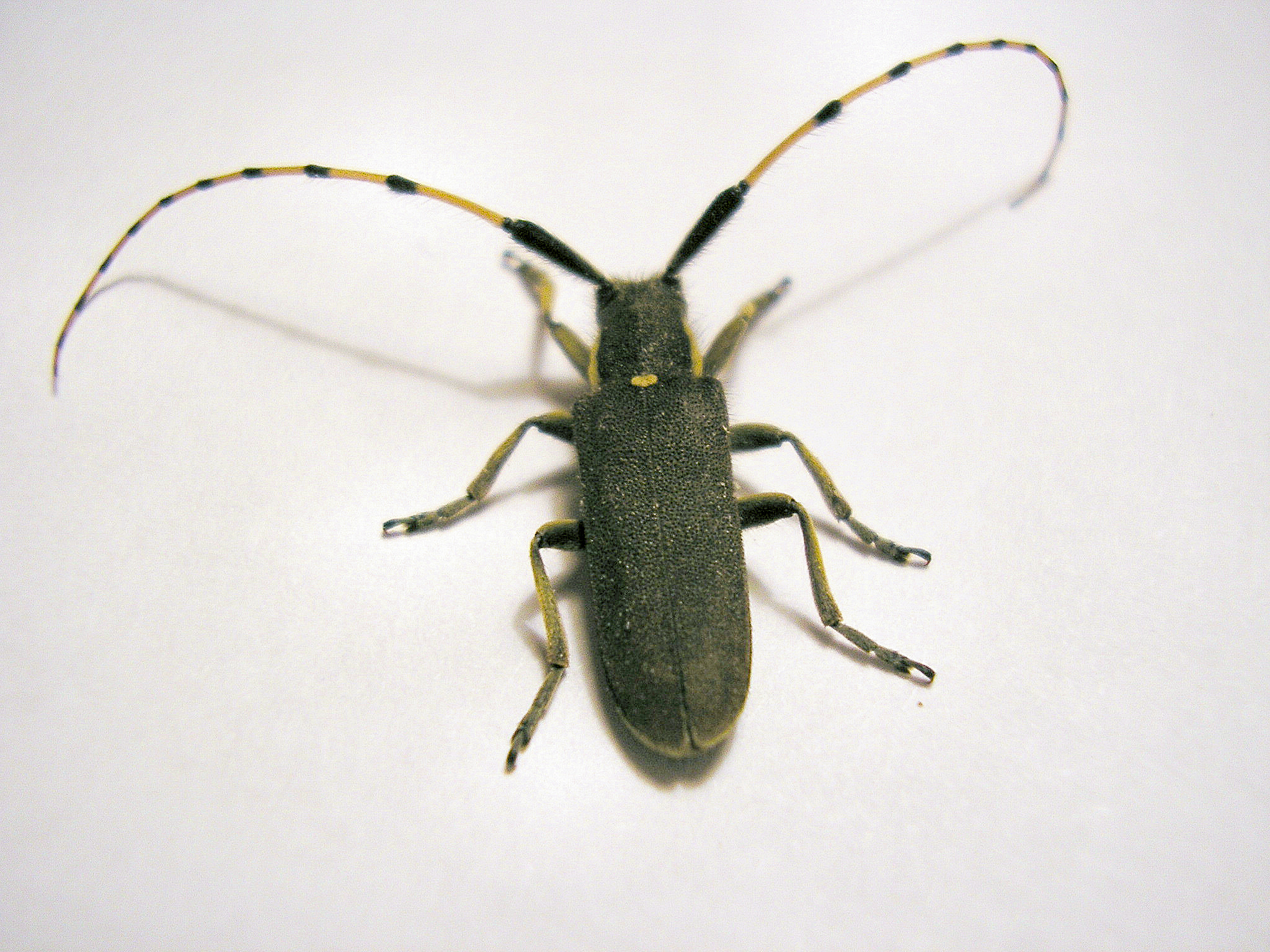

Scientific classification
- Kingdom: Animalia
- Phylum: Arthropoda
- Clade: Pancrustacea
- Class: Insecta
- Order: Coleoptera
- Suborder: Polyphaga
- Infraorder: Cucujiformia
- Family: Cerambycidae
- Genus: Agapanthia
- Species: A. annularis

Binomial name
- Agapanthia annularis (Olivier, 1795)

= Agapanthia annularis =

Species of beetle

Agapanthia annularis is a species of beetle in the family Cerambycidae. It was described by Guillaume-Antoine Olivier in 1795.
