= Agapanthia schmidti =

Scientific classification
- Kingdom: Animalia
- Phylum: Arthropoda
- Class: Insecta
- Order: Coleoptera
- Suborder: Polyphaga
- Infraorder: Cucujiformia
- Family: Cerambycidae
- Genus: Agapanthia
- Species: A. schmidti

Binomial name
- Agapanthia schmidti Holzschuh, 1975

Species of beetle

Agapanthia schmidti is a species of beetle in the family Cerambycidae. It was described by Holzschuh in 1975.
