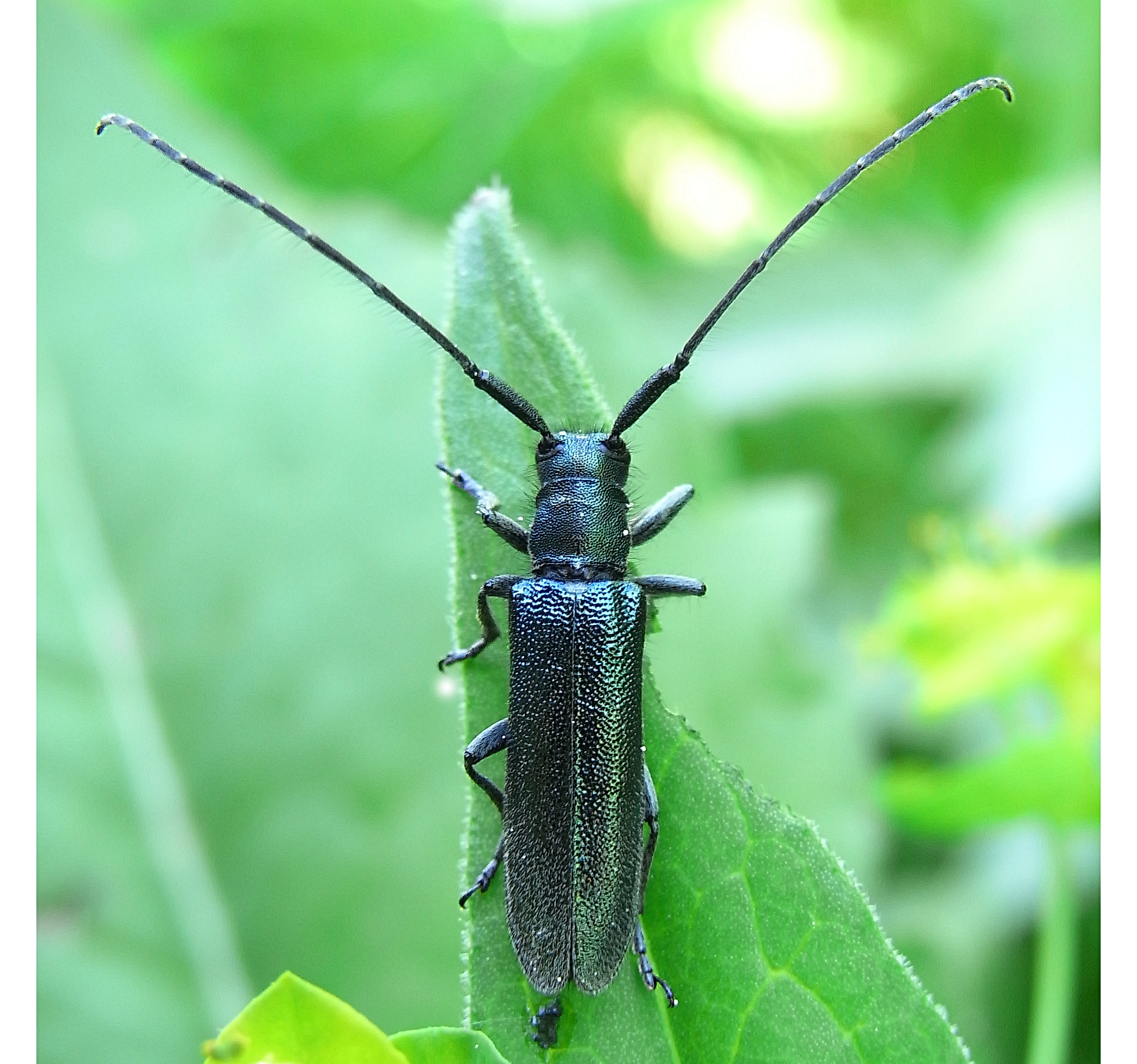

Scientific classification
- Kingdom: Animalia
- Phylum: Arthropoda
- Class: Insecta
- Order: Coleoptera
- Suborder: Polyphaga
- Infraorder: Cucujiformia
- Family: Cerambycidae
- Genus: Agapanthia
- Species: A. intermedia

Binomial name
- Agapanthia intermedia Ganglbauer, 1883

Synonyms
- Agapanthia cyanea var. intermedia Ganglbauer, 1884; Agapanthia violacea (Fröhlich) Mulsant, 1863; Agapanthia violacea m. intermedia var. breuningi Villiers, 1978; Agapanthia violacea m. intermedia (Ganglbauer, 1883) Villiers, 1978; Agapanthia violacea var. intermedia (Ganglbauer, 1883) Plavilstshikov, 1930

= Agapanthia intermedia =

Species of beetle

Agapanthia intermedia is a species of longhorn beetle in the subfamily Lamiinae found in Central and Eastern Europe, Romania, Slovakia, and the Netherlands and Kazakhstan. The colour of the species is black. It flies from May to June, and feeds on Knautia arvensis.
