= Agapanthia coeruleipennis =

Scientific classification
- Kingdom: Animalia
- Phylum: Arthropoda
- Class: Insecta
- Order: Coleoptera
- Suborder: Polyphaga
- Infraorder: Cucujiformia
- Family: Cerambycidae
- Genus: Agapanthia
- Species: A. coeruleipennis

Binomial name
- Agapanthia coeruleipennis Frivaldszky, 1878

Species of beetle

Agapanthia coeruleipennis is a species of beetle in the family Cerambycidae. It was described by Janos Frivaldszky in 1878. It is distributed in Turkey, Iran and Syria.
