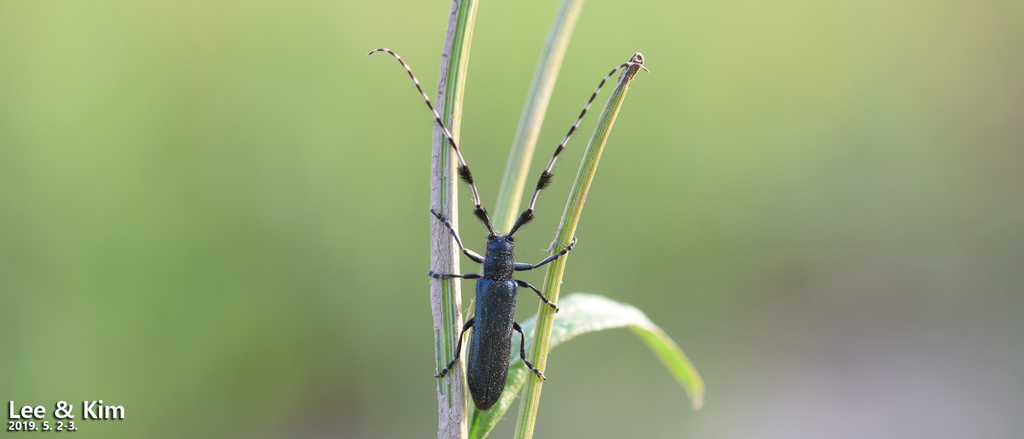

Scientific classification
- Kingdom: Animalia
- Phylum: Arthropoda
- Class: Insecta
- Order: Coleoptera
- Suborder: Polyphaga
- Infraorder: Cucujiformia
- Family: Cerambycidae
- Genus: Agapanthia
- Species: A. amurensis

Binomial name
- Agapanthia amurensis Kraatz, 1879

= Agapanthia amurensis =

Species of beetle

Agapanthia amurensis is a species of longhorn beetle in the subfamily Lamiinae found in Mongolia, North Korea and Russia.
