= Agapanthia soror =

Scientific classification
- Kingdom: Animalia
- Phylum: Arthropoda
- Class: Insecta
- Order: Coleoptera
- Suborder: Polyphaga
- Infraorder: Cucujiformia
- Family: Cerambycidae
- Genus: Agapanthia
- Species: A. soror

Binomial name
- Agapanthia soror Kraatz, 1882

Species of beetle

Agapanthia soror is a species of beetle in the subfamily Lamiinae, found in Kazakhstan and Uzbekistan. The species is 11–22 millimetres (0.43–0.87 in) in length, and is black coloured with yellow dots. Their flight time is from April to June.
