= Agapanthia subnigra =

Scientific classification
- Kingdom: Animalia
- Phylum: Arthropoda
- Class: Insecta
- Order: Coleoptera
- Suborder: Polyphaga
- Infraorder: Cucujiformia
- Family: Cerambycidae
- Genus: Agapanthia
- Species: A. subnigra

Binomial name
- Agapanthia subnigra Pic, 1890

Species of beetle

Agapanthia subnigra is a species of beetle in the family Cerambycidae. It was described by Maurice Pic in 1890.
