= Agapanthia irrorata =

Scientific classification
- Kingdom: Animalia
- Phylum: Arthropoda
- Clade: Pancrustacea
- Class: Insecta
- Order: Coleoptera
- Suborder: Polyphaga
- Infraorder: Cucujiformia
- Family: Cerambycidae
- Genus: Agapanthia
- Species: A. irrorata

Binomial name
- Agapanthia irrorata (Fabricius, 1787)

Synonyms
- Cerambyx roridus Gmelin, 1790; Saperda irrorata Fabricius, 1787

Species of beetle

Agapanthia irrorata is a species of beetle in the subfamily Lamiinae, found in North Africa, Southern Europe (including Portugal and Spain). The species is of black colour, with yellowish-white dots. It reaches a length of 13–23 millimetres (0.51–0.91 in). Their flight is from April to June. They are polyphagous and feed on various herbaceous plants, including Carduus, Daucus, Ferula, Onopordum and Salvia species.
