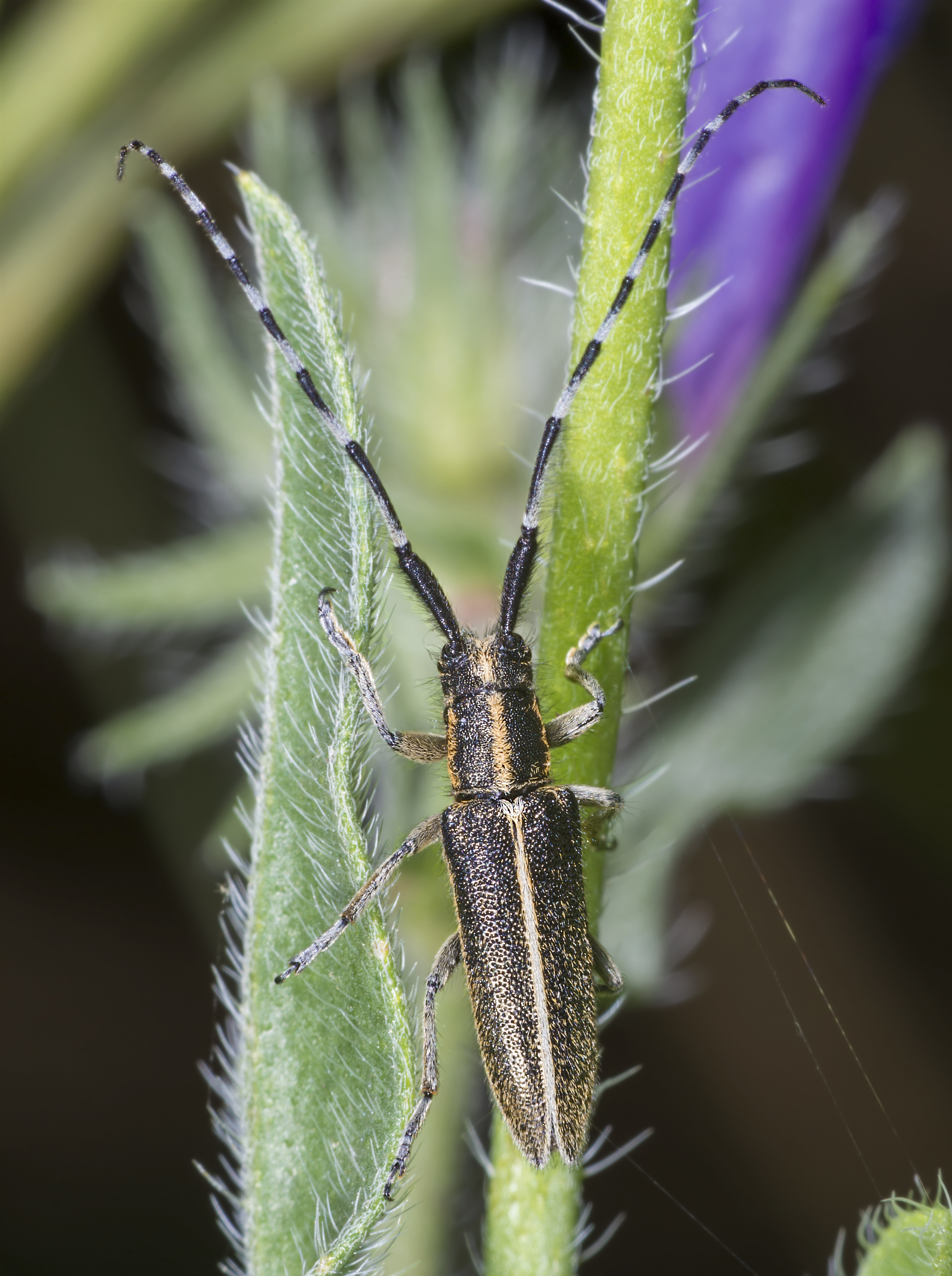

Scientific classification
- Kingdom: Animalia
- Phylum: Arthropoda
- Class: Insecta
- Order: Coleoptera
- Suborder: Polyphaga
- Infraorder: Cucujiformia
- Family: Cerambycidae
- Genus: Agapanthia
- Species: A. cardui

Binomial name
- Agapanthia cardui (Linnaeus, 1767)

Synonyms
- Agapanthia cardui pannonica (Kratochvíl Gutowski, 1992); Agapanthia cardui grossa (Pic, 1891); Agapanthia cardui subacutalis (Chevrolat, 1882); Agapanthia cardui velox (Gistel, 1857); Cerambyx cardui (Linnaeus, 1767); Eucrius cardui (Linnaeus, Gistel, 1856); Saperda annulata (Fabricius, Gistel, 1792); Saperda cardui (Linnaeus, Fabricius, 1787); Saperda coerulescens (Petagna, Gistel, 1787)

= Agapanthia cardui =

Species of beetle

Agapanthia cardui is a species of flat-faced longhorn beetle belonging to the family Cerambycidae, subfamily Lamiinae.

== Description ==
Agapanthia cardui adults grow up to 6–14 millimetres (0.24–0.55 in) and can be encountered from April through July, completing their life cycle in one year.

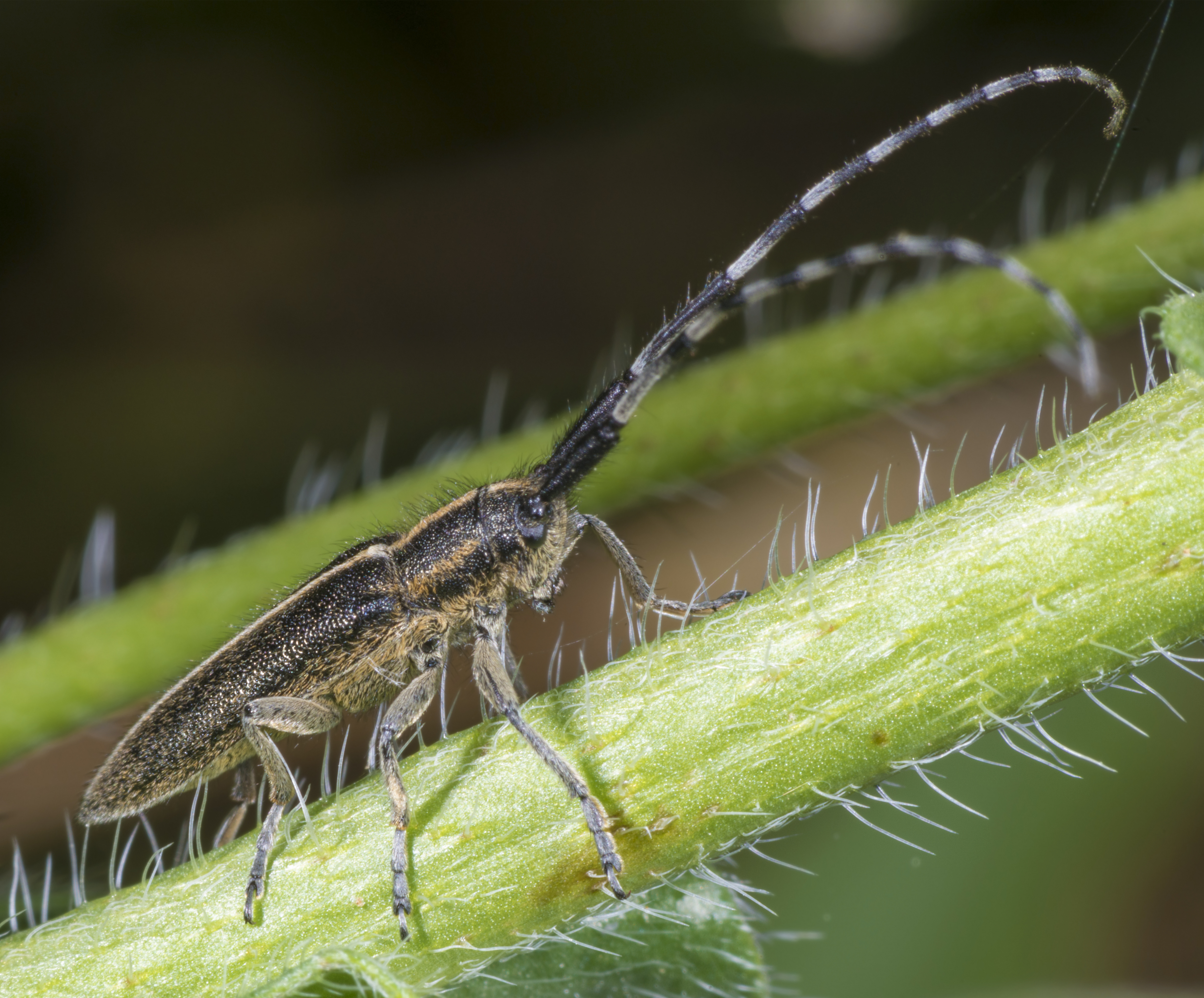
A. cardui – lateral view

=== Subspecies ===
Several subspecies of A. cardui are recorded in the entomological literature:

- Agapanthia cardui consobrina Chevrolat, 1840
- Agapanthia cardui marginalis (Mulsant), 1839
- Agapanthia cardui nigroaenea (Mulsant), 1839
- Agapanthia cardui peragalloi (Mulsant), 1862
- Agapanthia cardui ruficornis (Pic) Pesarini & Sabbadini, 2004

== Distribution ==
This beetle is present in most of Europe, in the Near East, and in the eastern Palearctic realm. In 2010, it was listed as occurring in 24 European countries. It has since expanded into the UK; the first specimens were recorded from East Kent in May 2018.

== Diet and habitat ==
Agapanthia cardui are polyphagous in herbaceous plants, mainly feeding on Carduus nutans (hence the specific name) and Silybum marianum, as well as on Salvia, Urtica and Cirsium species.
