= Agapanthia hirsuticornis =

Scientific classification
- Kingdom: Animalia
- Phylum: Arthropoda
- Clade: Pancrustacea
- Class: Insecta
- Order: Coleoptera
- Suborder: Polyphaga
- Infraorder: Cucujiformia
- Family: Cerambycidae
- Genus: Agapanthia
- Species: A. hirsuticornis

Binomial name
- Agapanthia hirsuticornis Holzschuh, 1975

Species of beetle

Agapanthia hirsuticornis is a species of longhorn beetle in the subfamily Lamiinae found only in Iran.
