= Agapanthia detrita =

Scientific classification
- Kingdom: Animalia
- Phylum: Arthropoda
- Class: Insecta
- Order: Coleoptera
- Suborder: Polyphaga
- Infraorder: Cucujiformia
- Family: Cerambycidae
- Genus: Agapanthia
- Species: A. detrita

Binomial name
- Agapanthia detrita Kraatz, 1882

Species of beetle

Agapanthia detrita is a species of beetle in the subfamily Lamiinae, found in Kazakhstan and Uzbekistan. The species is 12–22 mm in length, and is black coloured. Adults fly from April to June.
