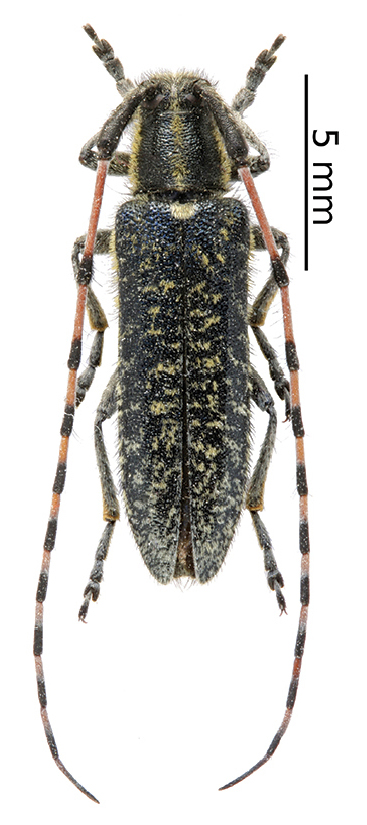

Scientific classification
- Kingdom: Animalia
- Phylum: Arthropoda
- Class: Insecta
- Order: Coleoptera
- Suborder: Polyphaga
- Infraorder: Cucujiformia
- Family: Cerambycidae
- Genus: Agapanthia
- Species: A. alternans

Binomial name
- Agapanthia alternans Fischer von Waldheim, 1842

= Agapanthia alternans =

Species of beetle

Agapanthia alternans is a species of beetle in the family Cerambycidae. It was described by Gotthelf Fischer von Waldheim in 1842.
