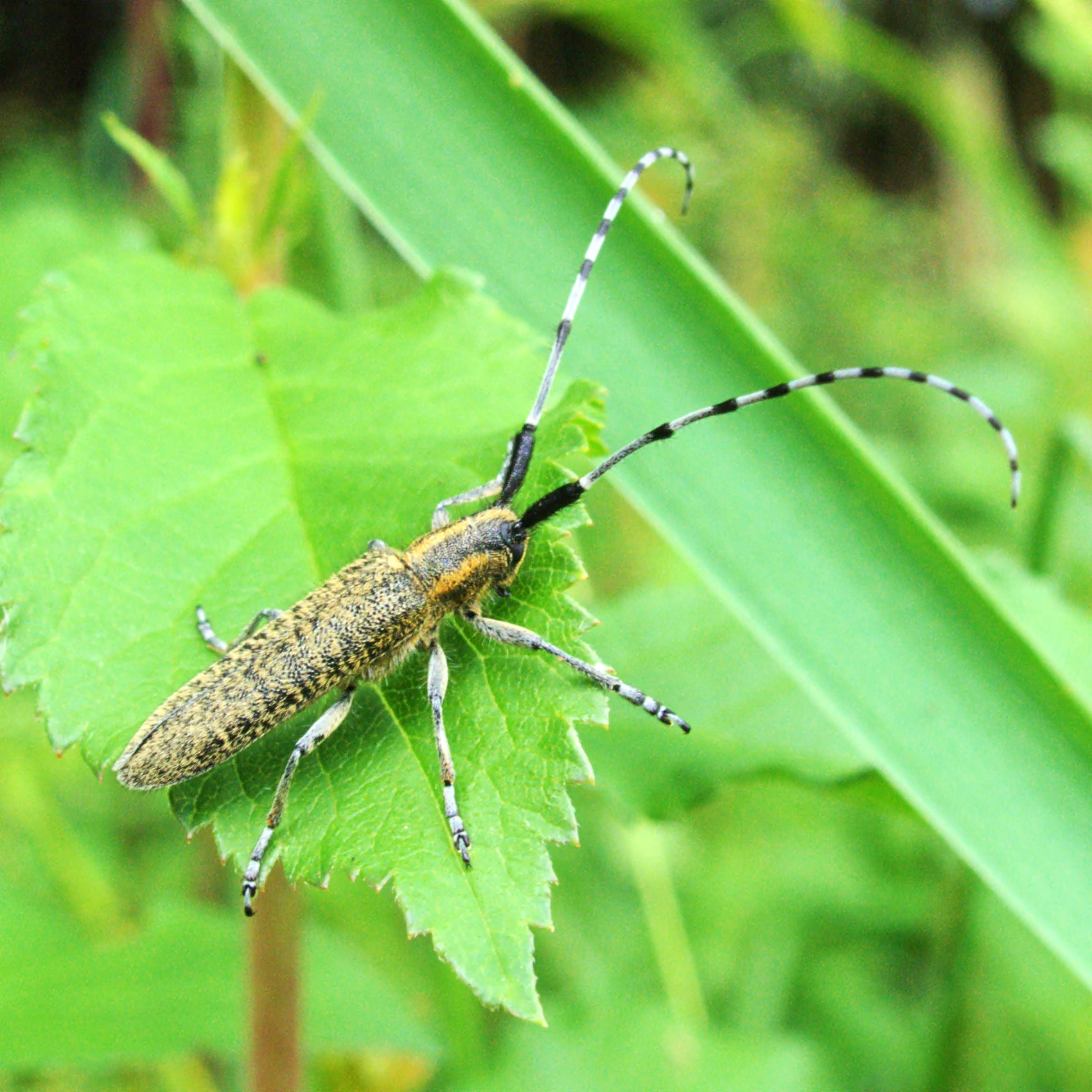

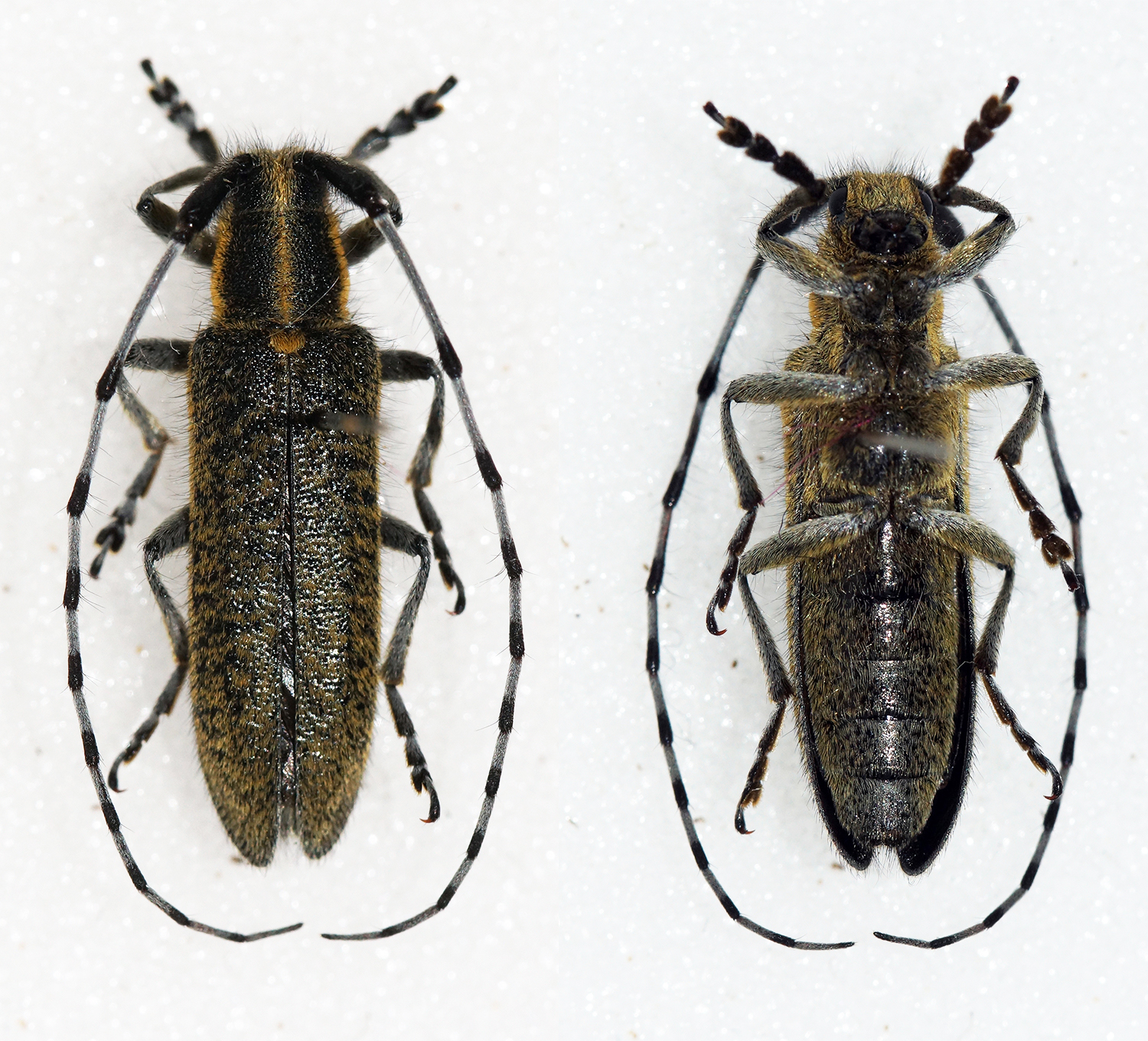

Scientific classification
- Kingdom: Animalia
- Phylum: Arthropoda
- Clade: Pancrustacea
- Class: Insecta
- Order: Coleoptera
- Suborder: Polyphaga
- Infraorder: Cucujiformia
- Family: Cerambycidae
- Genus: Agapanthia
- Species: A. villosoviridescens

Binomial name
- Agapanthia villosoviridescens (De Geer, 1775)

= Agapanthia villosoviridescens =

Species of beetle

Agapanthia villosoviridescens, also known as the golden-bloomed grey longhorn beetle, is a species of beetle in the subfamily Lamiinae, found in the Caucasus, Europe, Kazakhstan, the Near East, Russia and Turkey.

== Description and habitat ==
A. villosoviridescens

The beetle is named for its golden-black colour, with a golden bloom on its elytron and thorax. It reaches a length of 10–22 millimetres (0.39–0.87 in). It is a slim, cylindrical, grey-yellow over black longhorn beetle. In colour, it resembles the small aspen longhorn Saperda populnea, but it is considerably slimmer than this species. You can particularly tell them apart because the pronotum is much narrower than the elytra in A. villosoviridescens, while it's only slightly narrower in Saperda populnea. The antennae are clearly longer than the body, each segment is two-toned, light on the inner part and dark on the outer. The first antennal segment is black and unusually thick. The head is relatively small and densely hairy. The pronotum is clearly longer than wide and slightly narrowing towards the front. It has three grey-yellow longitudinal stripes. The elytra are narrow, parallel-sided, with pronounced, right-angled shoulders, about one and a half times as wide as the pronotum. They are speckled in dark grey and grey-yellow, but without regular spots. The legs are medium-length and grey.

== Habitat ==
Their flight time is from May to August. For the larval development the species is quite polyphagous with a wide variety of hosts, probably including Aconitum, Angelica, Anthriscus, Artemisia, Aster, Carduus, Cirsium, Chaerophyllum, Eupatorium, Foeniculum, Gentiana, Helleborus, Heracleum, Peucedanum, Salvia, Senecio, Urtica and Veratrum album. The larvae develop in the stalks of the host plant, working their way down while growing, cutting off the stalk and creating pupal cells near ground level. Adults emerge through a newly cut exit hole in the side of the stalk.
