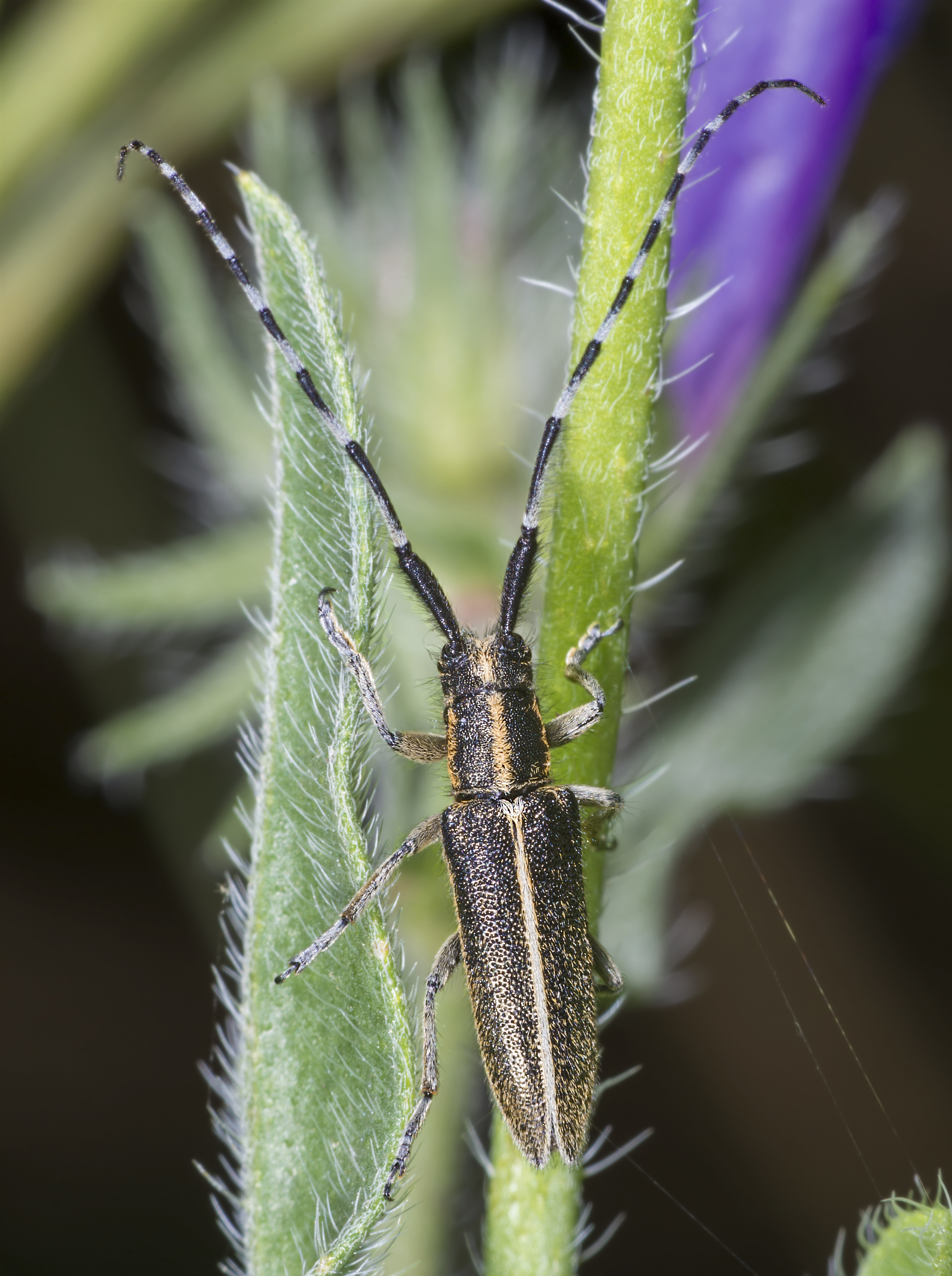
- Agapanthia cardui Type for the genus

Scientific classification
- Kingdom: Animalia
- Phylum: Arthropoda
- Clade: Pancrustacea
- Class: Insecta
- Order: Coleoptera
- Suborder: Polyphaga
- Infraorder: Cucujiformia
- Family: Cerambycidae
- Tribe: Agapanthiini
- Genus: Agapanthia; Audinet-Serville, 1835

Synonyms
- Eucrius Gistel, 1856; Segmentaria Gistel, 1848 nec Swainson, 1840

= Agapanthia =

Genus of beetles

Agapanthia is a genus of flat-faced longhorn beetle belonging to the family Cerambycidae, subfamily Lamiinae.

== List of species ==
The genus Agapanthia includes the following nine subgenera:

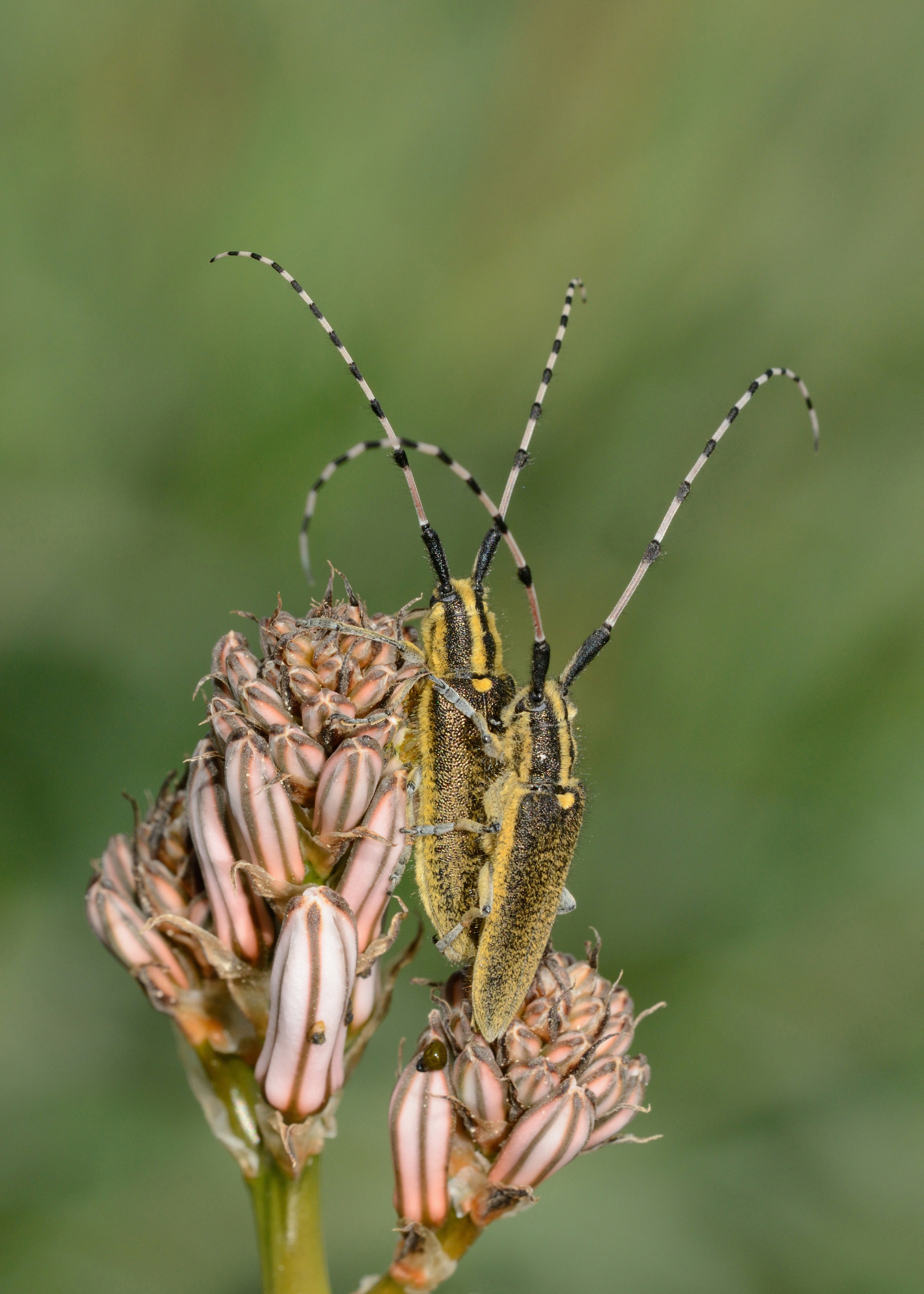
Agapanthia pustulifera

- Subgenus Agapanthia Audinet-Serville, 1835
  - Agapanthia boeberi (Fischer von Walheim, 1806) - endemic to Lebanon.
  - Agapanthia cardui (Linnaeus, 1767) - Europe, Near East and East Palearctic realm.
  - Agapanthia hirsuticornis Holzschuh, 1975 - endemic to Iran.
  - Agapanthia obydovi Danilevsky, 2000 - endemic to Kazakhstan.
  - Agapanthia suturalis (Fabricius, 1787)inq. Sicily, Spain, the Near East, North Africa, and Turkey.
  - Agapanthia talassica Kostin, 1973 - endemic to Kazakhstan.
- Subgenus Agapanthoplia Pesarini & Sabbadini, 2004
  - Agapanthia coeruleipennis Frivaldszky, 1878 - Turkey, Iran, and Syria.
- Subgenus Amurobia Pesarini & Sabbadini, 2004
  - Agapanthia amurensis Kraatz, 1879 - Mongolia, North Korea, and Russia.
  - Agapanthia japonica Kano, 1933 - Japan.
  - Agapanthia pilicornis Fabricius, 1787 - Trans-Baikal, Sakhalin, northern Mongolia, northern China, Korean Peninsula, and Japan.
  - Agapanthia yagii Hayashi, 1982 - Japan
- Subgenus Drosotrichia Pesarini & Sabbadini, 2004
  - Agapanthia annularis (Olivier, 1795)
- Subgenus Epoptes Gistl, 1857
  - Agapanthia alaiensis Kratochvíl, 1985
  - Agapanthia alexandris Pic, 1901
  - Agapanthia altaica Plavilstshikov, 1933
  - Agapanthia alternans Fischer von Waldheim, 1842
  - Agapanthia angelicae Reitter, 1898
  - Agapanthia asphodeli (Latreille, 1804)
  - Agapanthia auliensis Pic, 1907
  - Agapanthia cretica Bernhauer, 1978
  - Agapanthia cynarae (Germar, 1817)
  - Agapanthia dahli (Richter, 1821)
  - Agapanthia danilevskyi Lazarev, 2013
  - Agapanthia daurica Ganglbauer, 1883
  - Agapanthia detrita Kraatz, 1882
  - Agapanthia kindermanni Pic, 1905
  - Agapanthia lateralis Ganglbauer, 1883
  - Agapanthia lederi Ganglbauer, 1883
  - Agapanthia muellneri Reitter, 1898
  - Agapanthia nicosiensis Pic, 1927
  - Agapanthia nitidipennis Holzschuh, 1984
  - Agapanthia persica Semenov, 1893
  - Agapanthia probsti Holzschuh, 1984
  - Agapanthia pustulifera Pic, 1905
  - Agapanthia salviae Holzschuh, 1975
  - Agapanthia schmidti Holzschuh, 1975
  - Agapanthia schurmanni Sama, 1979
  - Agapanthia simplicicornis Reitter, 1898
  - Agapanthia subchalybaea Reitter, 1898
  - Agapanthia subflavida Pic, 1903
  - Agapanthia subnigra Pic, 1890
  - Agapanthia talassica Kostin, 1973
  - Agapanthia transcaspica Pic, 1900
  - Agapanthia turanica Plavilstshikov, 1929
  - Agapanthia verecunda Chevrolat, 1882
  - Agapanthia villosoviridescens (DeGeer, 1775) - Golden-bloomed Grey Longhorn
  - Agapanthia walteri Reitter, 1898
  - Agapanthia zappii Sama, 1987
- Subgenus Homoblephara Pesarini & Sabbadini, 2004
  - Agapanthia fallax Holzschuh, 1973
  - Agapanthia korostelevi Danilevsky, 1985
  - Agapanthia maculicornis (Gyllenhal, 1817)
  - Agapanthia orbachi Sama, 1993
- Subgenus Smaragdula Pesarini & Sabbadini, 2004
  - Agapanthia amitina Holzschuh, 1989
  - Agapanthia chalybaea Faldermann, 1837
  - Agapanthia frivaldszkyi Ganglbauer, 1883
  - Agapanthia gemella Holzschuh, 1989
  - Agapanthia incerta Plavilstshikov, 1930
  - Agapanthia intermedia Ganglbauer, 1883
  - Agapanthia lais Reiche, 1858
  - Agapanthia osmanlis Reiche & Saulcy, 1858
  - Agapanthia persicola Reitter, 1894
  - Agapanthia pesarinii Rapuzzi & Sama, 2010
  - Agapanthia violacea (Fabricius, 1775)
- Subgenus Stichodera Pesarini & Sabbadini, 2004
  - Agapanthia irrorata (Fabricius, 1787)
  - Agapanthia nigriventris Waterhouse, 1889
  - Agapanthia soror Kraatz, 1882
- Subgenus Synthapsia Pesarini & Sabbadini, 2004
  - Agapanthia kirbyi (Gyllenhal, 1817)
