= Poliaenus californicus =

Scientific classification
- Domain: Eukaryota
- Kingdom: Animalia
- Phylum: Arthropoda
- Class: Insecta
- Order: Coleoptera
- Suborder: Polyphaga
- Infraorder: Cucujiformia
- Family: Cerambycidae
- Tribe: Pogonocherini
- Genus: Poliaenus
- Species: P. californicus

Binomial name
- Poliaenus californicus (Schaeffer, 1908)

Species of beetle

Poliaenus californicus is a species of beetle in the family Cerambycidae. It was described by Schaeffer in 1908. It is known from the United States.
