= Hypsioma grisea =

Scientific classification
- Kingdom: Animalia
- Phylum: Arthropoda
- Class: Insecta
- Order: Coleoptera
- Suborder: Polyphaga
- Infraorder: Cucujiformia
- Family: Cerambycidae
- Genus: Hypsioma
- Species: H. grisea

Binomial name
- Hypsioma grisea (Fleutiaux & Sallé, 1889)

Synonyms
- Hypomia grisea Fleutiaux & Sallé, 1889; Hypsioma insularis Fisher, 1935; Hypsioma picticornis Gahan, 1895; Tritania grisea (Fleutiaux & Sallé) Breuning, 1961

Species of beetle

Hypsioma grisea is a species of beetle in the family Cerambycidae. It was described by Fleutiaux and Sallé in 1889, originally under the genus Hypomia. It is known from Dominica, Guadeloupe, Barbados, and Saint Lucia. It feeds on Mangifera indica, Lonchocarpus punctatus, and Piscidia carthagenensis.
