= Poliaenus oregonus =

Scientific classification
- Domain: Eukaryota
- Kingdom: Animalia
- Phylum: Arthropoda
- Class: Insecta
- Order: Coleoptera
- Suborder: Polyphaga
- Infraorder: Cucujiformia
- Family: Cerambycidae
- Tribe: Pogonocherini
- Genus: Poliaenus
- Species: P. oregonus

Binomial name
- Poliaenus oregonus (LeConte, 1861)

Species of beetle

Poliaenus oregonus is a species of beetle in the family Cerambycidae. It was described by John Lawrence LeConte in 1861. It is known from North America.
