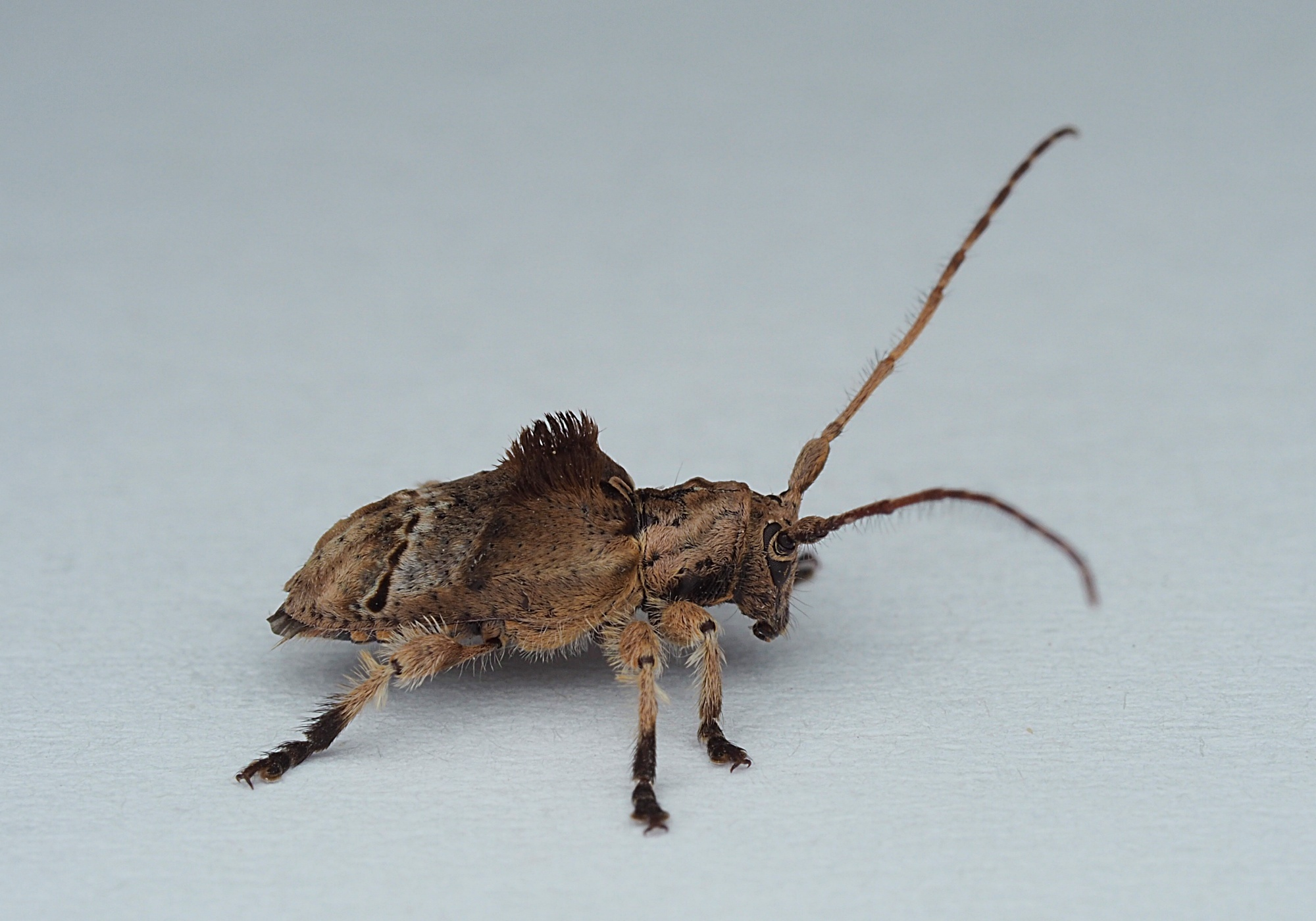

Scientific classification
- Domain: Eukaryota
- Kingdom: Animalia
- Phylum: Arthropoda
- Class: Insecta
- Order: Coleoptera
- Suborder: Polyphaga
- Infraorder: Cucujiformia
- Family: Cerambycidae
- Tribe: Pogonocherini
- Genus: Hybolasius
- Species: H. crista

Binomial name
- Hybolasius crista (Fabricius, 1775)

Synonyms
- Hybolasius cognatus Broun, 1903; Hybolasius concolor Broun, 1876; Lamia crista Fabricius, 1775

= Hybolasius crista =

Species of beetle

Hybolasius crista is a species of beetle in the family Cerambycidae. It was described by Johan Christian Fabricius in 1775. It is known from New Zealand.
