= Hybolasius trigonellaris =

Scientific classification
- Domain: Eukaryota
- Kingdom: Animalia
- Phylum: Arthropoda
- Class: Insecta
- Order: Coleoptera
- Suborder: Polyphaga
- Infraorder: Cucujiformia
- Family: Cerambycidae
- Tribe: Pogonocherini
- Genus: Hybolasius
- Species: H. trigonellaris

Binomial name
- Hybolasius trigonellaris Hutton, 1898

Species of beetle

Hybolasius trigonellaris is a species of beetle in the family Cerambycidae. It was described by Hutton in 1898. It is known from New Zealand.
