= Poliaenus concolor =

Scientific classification
- Domain: Eukaryota
- Kingdom: Animalia
- Phylum: Arthropoda
- Class: Insecta
- Order: Coleoptera
- Suborder: Polyphaga
- Infraorder: Cucujiformia
- Family: Cerambycidae
- Tribe: Pogonocherini
- Genus: Poliaenus
- Species: P. concolor

Binomial name
- Poliaenus concolor (Schaeffer, 1909)

Species of beetle

Poliaenus concolor is a species of beetle in the family Cerambycidae. It was described by Schaeffer in 1909. It is known from Baja California.
