= Soluta =

Soluta may refer to:

- Soluta (echinoderm), an extinct clade of echinoderms
- Soluta (beetle), a genus of insects in the family Cerambycidae
