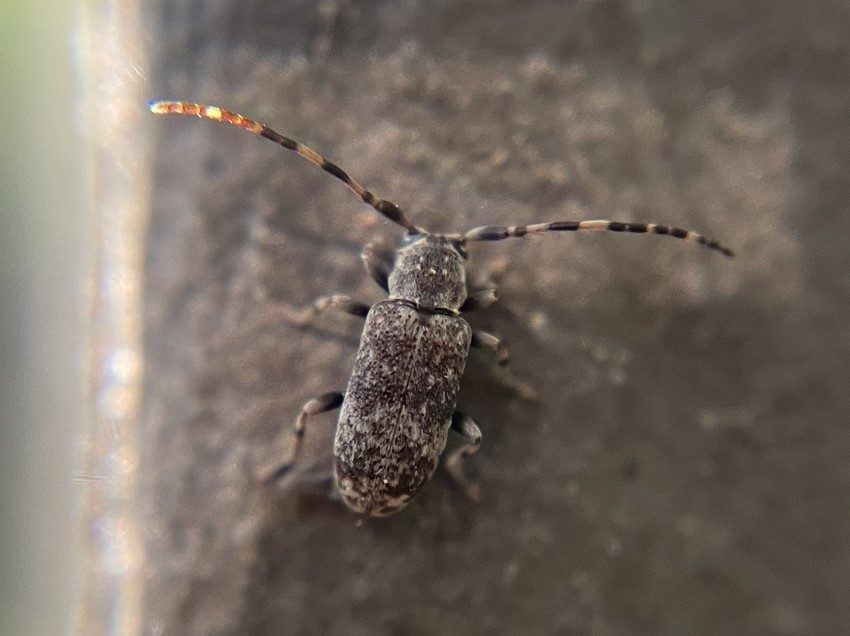

Scientific classification
- Kingdom: Animalia
- Phylum: Arthropoda
- Class: Insecta
- Order: Coleoptera
- Suborder: Polyphaga
- Infraorder: Cucujiformia
- Family: Cerambycidae
- Genus: Zaplous
- Species: Z. annulatus

Binomial name
- Zaplous annulatus (Chevrolat, 1862)

Synonyms
- Zaplous hubbardi LeConte, 1878; Exocentrus annulatus (Chevrolat, ) Gemminger & Harold, 1873; Ecyron annulatus (Chevrolat, ) Gundlach, 1891; Ecyrus annulatus Chevrolat, 1862

= Zaplous annulatus =

Species of beetle

Zaplous annulatus is a species of beetle in the family Cerambycidae. It was originally described by Louis Alexandre Auguste Chevrolat in the genus Ecyrus and is known from Cuba and the United States.
