= Poliaenus negundo =

Scientific classification
- Domain: Eukaryota
- Kingdom: Animalia
- Phylum: Arthropoda
- Class: Insecta
- Order: Coleoptera
- Suborder: Polyphaga
- Infraorder: Cucujiformia
- Family: Cerambycidae
- Tribe: Pogonocherini
- Genus: Poliaenus
- Species: P. negundo

Binomial name
- Poliaenus negundo (Schaeffer, 1905)

Species of beetle

Poliaenus negundo is a species of beetle in the family Cerambycidae. It was described by Schaeffer in 1905. It is known from Mexico and the United States.
