= Hybolasius cristatellus =

Scientific classification
- Domain: Eukaryota
- Kingdom: Animalia
- Phylum: Arthropoda
- Class: Insecta
- Order: Coleoptera
- Suborder: Polyphaga
- Infraorder: Cucujiformia
- Family: Cerambycidae
- Tribe: Pogonocherini
- Genus: Hybolasius
- Species: H. cristatellus

Binomial name
- Hybolasius cristatellus Bates, 1876

Species of beetle

Hybolasius cristatellus is a species of beetle in the family Cerambycidae. It was described by Henry Walter Bates in 1876. It is known from New Zealand.
