= Hybolasius wakefieldi =

Scientific classification
- Domain: Eukaryota
- Kingdom: Animalia
- Phylum: Arthropoda
- Class: Insecta
- Order: Coleoptera
- Suborder: Polyphaga
- Infraorder: Cucujiformia
- Family: Cerambycidae
- Tribe: Pogonocherini
- Genus: Hybolasius
- Species: H. wakefieldi

Binomial name
- Hybolasius wakefieldi Bates, 1876

Species of beetle

Hybolasius wakefieldi is a species of beetle in the family Cerambycidae. It was described by Henry Walter Bates in 1876. It is known from New Zealand.
