= Hybolasius viridescens =

Scientific classification
- Domain: Eukaryota
- Kingdom: Animalia
- Phylum: Arthropoda
- Class: Insecta
- Order: Coleoptera
- Suborder: Polyphaga
- Infraorder: Cucujiformia
- Family: Cerambycidae
- Tribe: Pogonocherini
- Genus: Hybolasius
- Species: H. viridescens

Binomial name
- Hybolasius viridescens Bates, 1874

Species of beetle

Hybolasius viridescens is a species of beetle in the family Cerambycidae. It was described by Henry Walter Bates in 1874. It is known from New Zealand.
