= Poliaenus obscurus =

Scientific classification
- Domain: Eukaryota
- Kingdom: Animalia
- Phylum: Arthropoda
- Class: Insecta
- Order: Coleoptera
- Suborder: Polyphaga
- Infraorder: Cucujiformia
- Family: Cerambycidae
- Tribe: Pogonocherini
- Genus: Poliaenus
- Species: P. obscurus

Binomial name
- Poliaenus obscurus (Fall, 1910)

Species of beetle

Poliaenus obscurus is a species of beetle in the family Cerambycidae. It was described by Fall in 1910.

== Subspecies ==
- Poliaenus obscurus albidus Linsley, 1933
- Poliaenus obscurus obscurus (Fall, 1910)
- Poliaenus obscurus ponderosae Linsley, 1935
- Poliaenus obscurus schaefferi Linsley, 1933
