= Poliaenus nuevoleonis =

Scientific classification
- Domain: Eukaryota
- Kingdom: Animalia
- Phylum: Arthropoda
- Class: Insecta
- Order: Coleoptera
- Suborder: Polyphaga
- Infraorder: Cucujiformia
- Family: Cerambycidae
- Tribe: Pogonocherini
- Genus: Poliaenus
- Species: P. nuevoleonis

Binomial name
- Poliaenus nuevoleonis Chemsak & Linsley, 1975

Species of beetle

Poliaenus nuevoleonis is a species of beetle in the family Cerambycidae. It was described by Chemsak and Linsley in 1975.

== Subspecies ==
- Poliaenus nuevoleonis nuevoleonis Chemsak & Linsley, 1975
- Poliaenus nuevoleonis similnegundo Skiles, 1979
