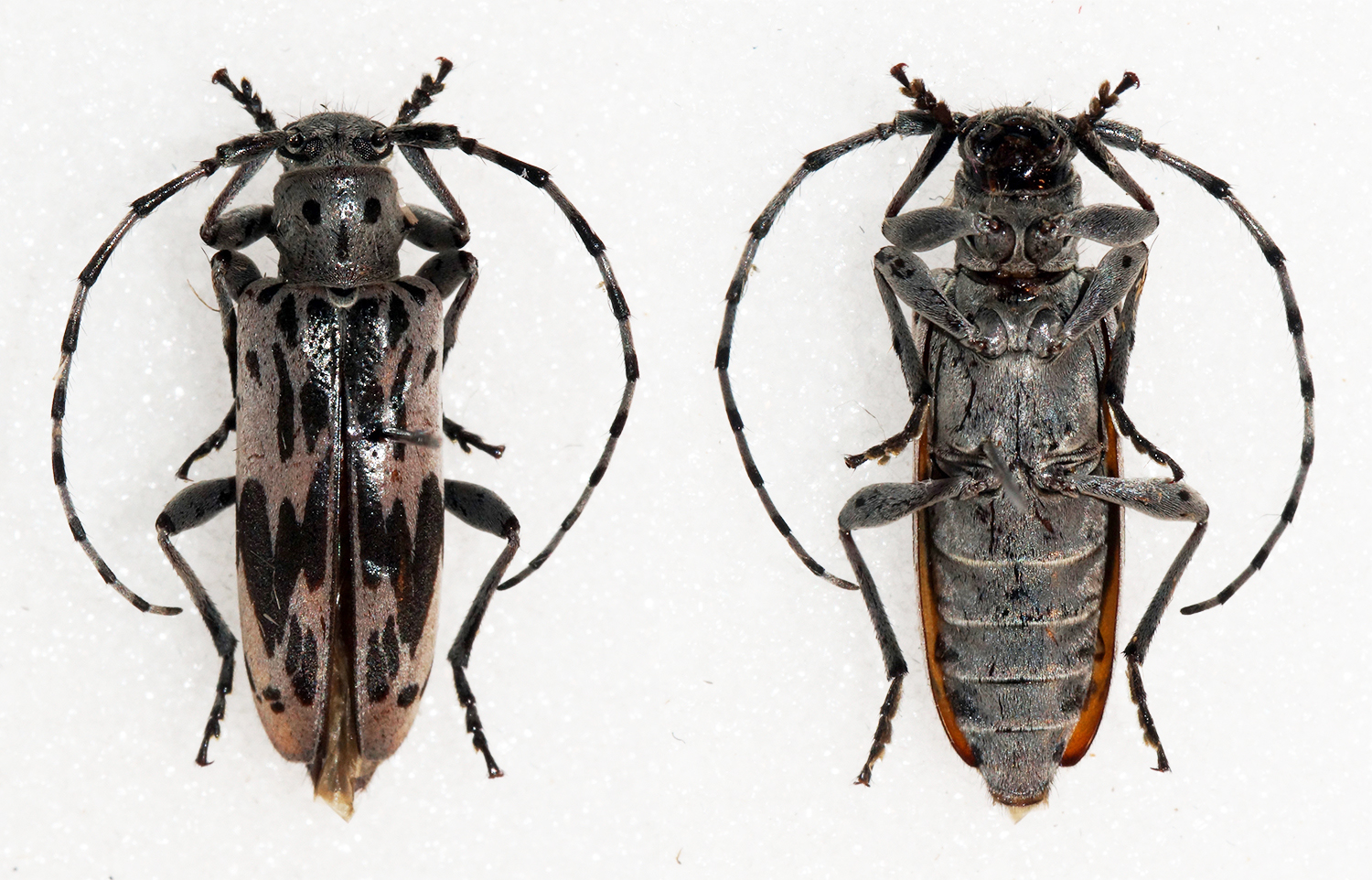
- Tigrinestola tigrina (male)

Scientific classification
- Kingdom: Animalia
- Phylum: Arthropoda
- Class: Insecta
- Order: Coleoptera
- Suborder: Polyphaga
- Infraorder: Cucujiformia
- Family: Cerambycidae
- Genus: Tigrinestola
- Species: T. tigrina

Binomial name
- Tigrinestola tigrina (Skinner, 1905)

Synonyms
- Lypsimena tigrina Skinner, 1905

= Tigrinestola tigrina =

Species of beetle

Tigrinestola tigrina is a species of beetle in the family Cerambycidae. It was described by Skinner in 1905, originally under the genus Lypsimena. It is known from Mexico, Baja California and the United States.
