= Hybolasius pumilus =

Scientific classification
- Domain: Eukaryota
- Kingdom: Animalia
- Phylum: Arthropoda
- Class: Insecta
- Order: Coleoptera
- Suborder: Polyphaga
- Infraorder: Cucujiformia
- Family: Cerambycidae
- Tribe: Pogonocherini
- Genus: Hybolasius
- Species: H. pumilus

Binomial name
- Hybolasius pumilus (Pascoe, 1876)

Synonyms
- Hybolasius bellicosus Broun, 1880; Hybolasius deplanatus Sharp, 1882; Hybolasius rugicollis Broun, 1913; Hybolasius vittiger Broun, 1914

Species of beetle

Hybolasius pumilus is a species of beetle in the family Cerambycidae. It was described by Francis Polkinghorne Pascoe in 1876. It is known from New Zealand.
