= Poliaenus abietis =

Scientific classification
- Domain: Eukaryota
- Kingdom: Animalia
- Phylum: Arthropoda
- Class: Insecta
- Order: Coleoptera
- Suborder: Polyphaga
- Infraorder: Cucujiformia
- Family: Cerambycidae
- Tribe: Pogonocherini
- Genus: Poliaenus
- Species: P. abietis

Binomial name
- Poliaenus abietis Tyson, 1968

Species of beetle

Poliaenus abietis is a species of beetle in the family Cerambycidae. It was described by Tyson in 1968. It is known from the United States.
