= Poliaenus batesi =

Scientific classification
- Domain: Eukaryota
- Kingdom: Animalia
- Phylum: Arthropoda
- Class: Insecta
- Order: Coleoptera
- Suborder: Polyphaga
- Infraorder: Cucujiformia
- Family: Cerambycidae
- Tribe: Pogonocherini
- Genus: Poliaenus
- Species: P. batesi

Binomial name
- Poliaenus batesi Linsley, 1933

Species of beetle

Poliaenus batesi is a species of beetle in the family Cerambycidae. It was described by Linsley in 1933. It is known from Guatemala.
