= Hypsioma affinis =

Scientific classification
- Kingdom: Animalia
- Phylum: Arthropoda
- Class: Insecta
- Order: Coleoptera
- Suborder: Polyphaga
- Infraorder: Cucujiformia
- Family: Cerambycidae
- Genus: Hypsioma
- Species: H. affinis

Binomial name
- Hypsioma affinis Thomson, 1860

Species of beetle

Hypsioma affinis is a species of beetle in the family Cerambycidae. It was described by James Thomson in 1860. It is known from Brazil.
