= Hybolasius parvus =

Scientific classification
- Kingdom: Animalia
- Phylum: Arthropoda
- Class: Insecta
- Order: Coleoptera
- Suborder: Polyphaga
- Infraorder: Cucujiformia
- Family: Cerambycidae
- Genus: Hybolasius
- Species: H. parvus

Binomial name
- Hybolasius parvus Broun, 1880

Species of beetle

Hybolasius parvus is a species of beetle in the family Cerambycidae. It was described by Broun in 1880. It is known from New Zealand. It contains the varietas Hybolasius parvus var. pusillus.
