= Lypsimena tomentosa =

Scientific classification
- Kingdom: Animalia
- Phylum: Arthropoda
- Class: Insecta
- Order: Coleoptera
- Suborder: Polyphaga
- Infraorder: Cucujiformia
- Family: Cerambycidae
- Genus: Lypsimena
- Species: L. tomentosa

Binomial name
- Lypsimena tomentosa Chemsak & Linsley, 1978

Species of beetle

Lypsimena tomentosa is a species of beetle in the family Cerambycidae. It was described by Chemsak and Linsley in 1978. It is known from Venezuela.
