= Tigrinestola howdeni =

Scientific classification
- Kingdom: Animalia
- Phylum: Arthropoda
- Class: Insecta
- Order: Coleoptera
- Suborder: Polyphaga
- Infraorder: Cucujiformia
- Family: Cerambycidae
- Genus: Tigrinestola
- Species: T. howdeni

Binomial name
- Tigrinestola howdeni Chemsak & Linsley, 1966

Species of beetle

Tigrinestola howdeni is a species of beetle in the family Cerambycidae. It was described by Chemsak and Linsley in 1966. It is known from Mexico.
