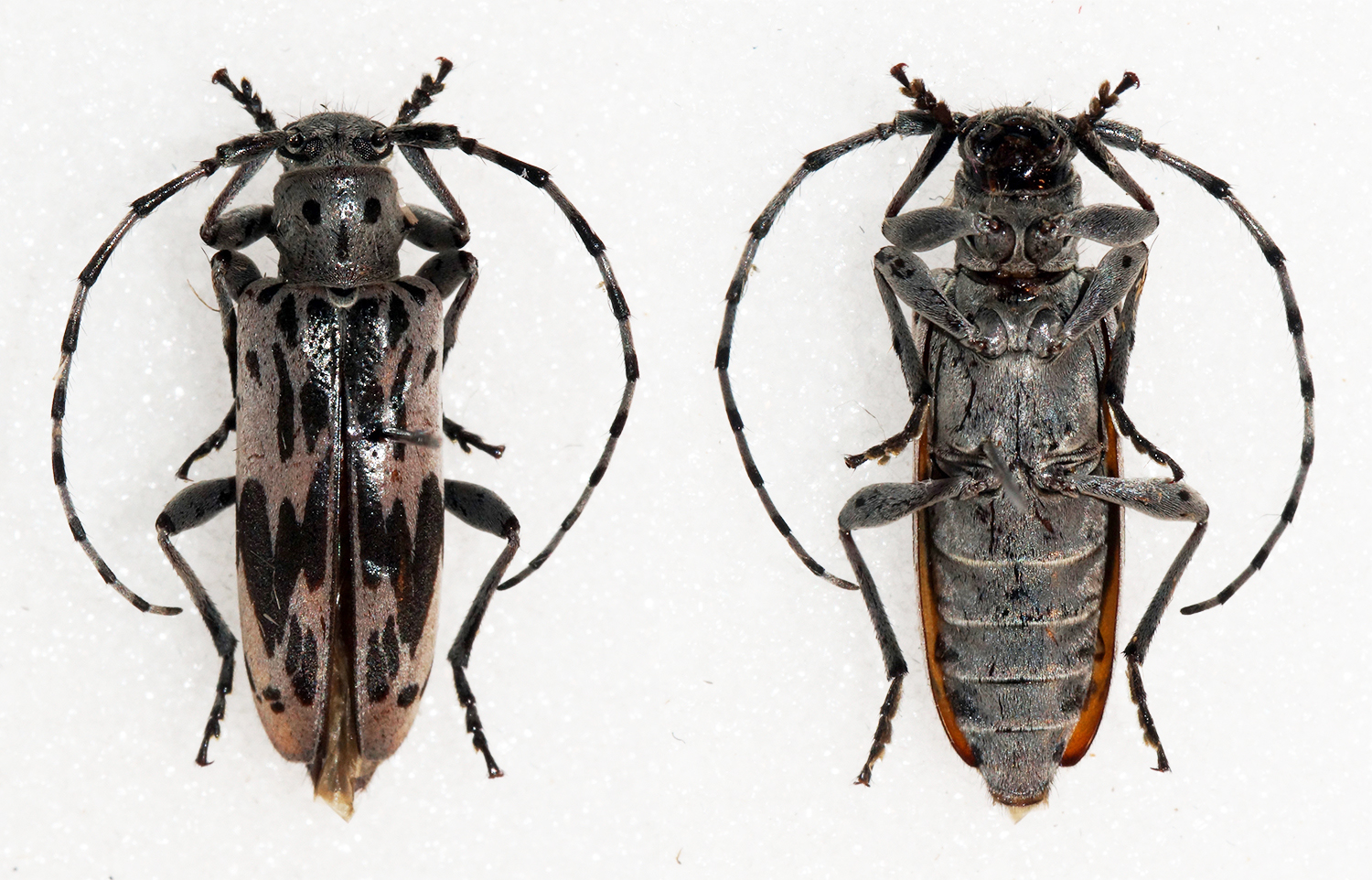
- Tigrinestola (male)

Scientific classification
- Kingdom: Animalia
- Phylum: Arthropoda
- Class: Insecta
- Order: Coleoptera
- Suborder: Polyphaga
- Infraorder: Cucujiformia
- Family: Cerambycidae
- Tribe: Desmiphorini
- Genus: Tigrinestola

= Tigrinestola =

Genus of beetles

Tigrinestola is a genus of longhorn beetles of the subfamily Lamiinae, containing the following species:

- Tigrinestola howdeni Chemsak & Linsley, 1966
- Tigrinestola tigrina (Skinner, 1905)
