= Lypsimena proletaria =

Scientific classification
- Kingdom: Animalia
- Phylum: Arthropoda
- Class: Insecta
- Order: Coleoptera
- Suborder: Polyphaga
- Infraorder: Cucujiformia
- Family: Cerambycidae
- Genus: Lypsimena
- Species: L. proletaria

Binomial name
- Lypsimena proletaria (Melzer, 1931)

Synonyms
- Estoloderces proletaria Melzer, 1931

Species of beetle

Lypsimena proletaria is a species of beetle in the family Cerambycidae. It was described by Melzer in 1931. It is known from Brazil.
