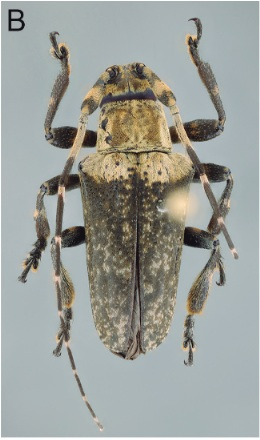

Scientific classification
- Kingdom: Animalia
- Phylum: Arthropoda
- Clade: Pancrustacea
- Class: Insecta
- Order: Coleoptera
- Suborder: Polyphaga
- Infraorder: Cucujiformia
- Family: Cerambycidae
- Genus: Hypsioma
- Species: H. basalis

Binomial name
- Hypsioma basalis Thomson, 1860

Synonyms
- Hypselomus basalis Bates, 1865; Hypsioma chaseba Dillon & Dillon, 1945

= Hypsioma basalis =

Species of beetle

Hypsioma basalis is a species of beetle in the family Cerambycidae. It was described by James Thomson in 1860. It is known from Brazil (Espirito Santo, Rio de Janeiro, São Paulo).
