= Ecyrus hirtipes =

Scientific classification
- Kingdom: Animalia
- Phylum: Arthropoda
- Class: Insecta
- Order: Coleoptera
- Suborder: Polyphaga
- Infraorder: Cucujiformia
- Family: Cerambycidae
- Genus: Ecyrus
- Species: E. hirtipes

Binomial name
- Ecyrus hirtipes Gahan, 1895

Synonyms
- Ecyrus flavus Fisher, 1932; Ecyrus hoffmanni Fisher, 1932; Ecyrus insularis Fisher, 1932; Ecyrus nanus Fisher, 1932

Species of beetle

Ecyrus hirtipes is a species of beetle in the family Cerambycidae. It was described by Charles Joseph Gahan in 1895. It is known from Guadeloupe, Barbados, Martinique, Cuba, Saint Vincent and the Grenadines, the Dominican Republic, Bahamas, Grenada, Haiti, and Puerto Rico. It feeds on Inga ingoides.
