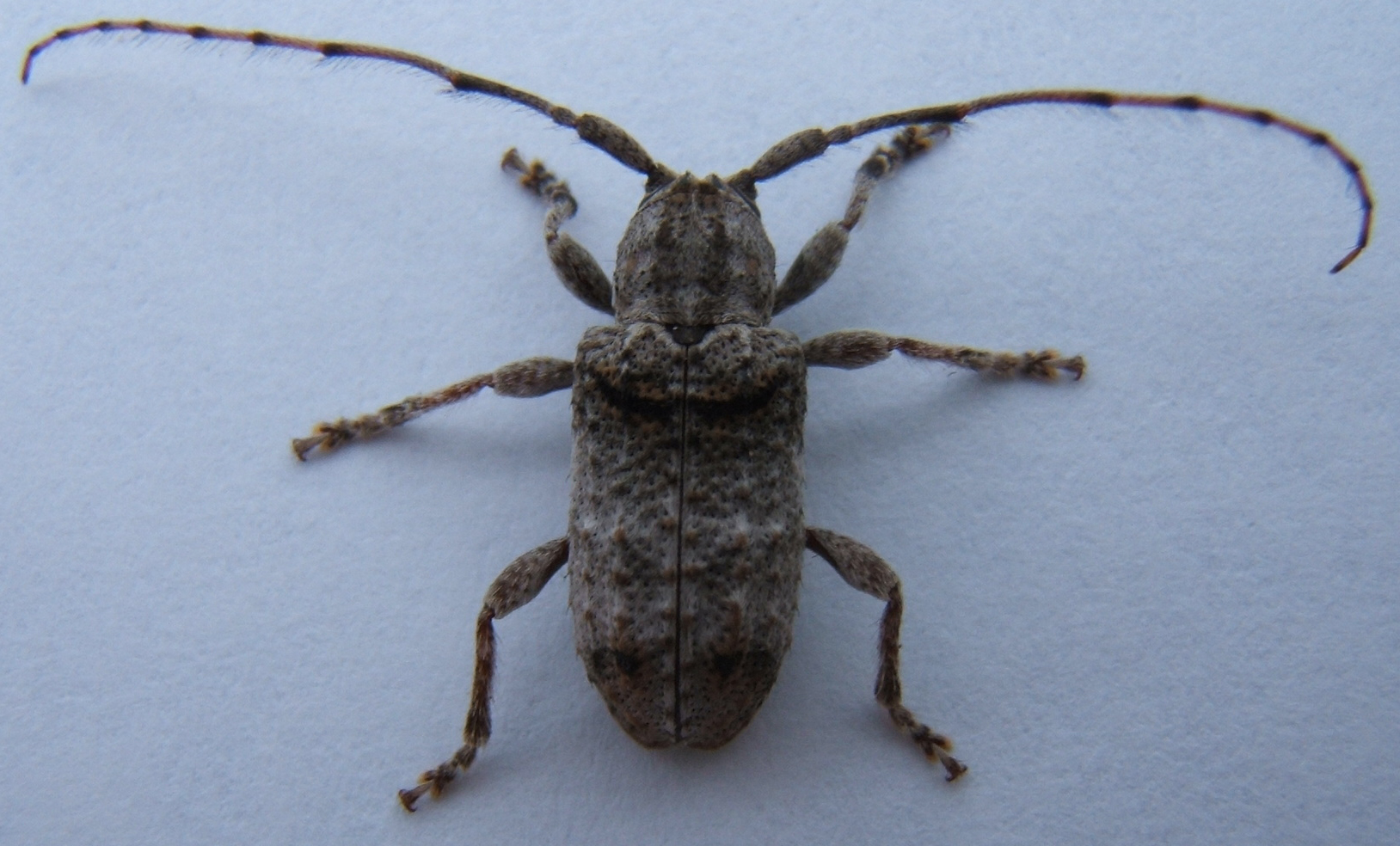

Scientific classification
- Kingdom: Animalia
- Phylum: Arthropoda
- Class: Insecta
- Order: Coleoptera
- Suborder: Polyphaga
- Infraorder: Cucujiformia
- Family: Cerambycidae
- Genus: Ecyrus
- Species: E. arcuatus

Binomial name
- Ecyrus arcuatus Gahan, 1892

= Ecyrus arcuatus =

Species of beetle

Ecyrus arcuatus is a species of beetle in the family Cerambycidae. It was described by Charles Joseph Gahan in 1892. It is known from Mexico, Honduras, Guatemala, and the United States.
