= Lypsimena fuscata =

Scientific classification
- Kingdom: Animalia
- Phylum: Arthropoda
- Class: Insecta
- Order: Coleoptera
- Suborder: Polyphaga
- Infraorder: Cucujiformia
- Family: Cerambycidae
- Genus: Lypsimena
- Species: L. fuscata

Binomial name
- Lypsimena fuscata Haldeman, 1847

Synonyms
- Alloeoscelis leptis Bates, 1885; Estoloderces navarroi Melzer, 1928; Lypsimena brasiliensis Aurivillius, 1922; Lypsimena californica Horn, 1885; Lypsimena fuscata Bruch, 1912; Lypsimena navarroi Biezanko & Bosq, 1956

Species of beetle

Lypsimena fuscata is a species of beetle in the family Cerambycidae. It was described by Haldeman in 1847. It is known from the United States, Bahamas, Guyana, Brazil, Colombia, Cuba, Panama, Puerto Rico, the Dominican Republic, Haiti, Jamaica, French Guiana, Mexico, Paraguay, Argentina, Uruguay, Honduras, and Venezuela.
