= Lypsimena nodipennis =

Scientific classification
- Kingdom: Animalia
- Phylum: Arthropoda
- Class: Insecta
- Order: Coleoptera
- Suborder: Polyphaga
- Infraorder: Cucujiformia
- Family: Cerambycidae
- Genus: Lypsimena
- Species: L. nodipennis

Binomial name
- Lypsimena nodipennis (Burmeister, 1865)

Synonyms
- Onocephala nodipennis Burmeister, 1865

Species of beetle

Lypsimena nodipennis is a species of beetle in the family Cerambycidae. It was described by Hermann Burmeister in 1865. It is known from Argentina, Uruguay and Brazil.
