= Hybolasius thoracicus =

Scientific classification
- Kingdom: Animalia
- Phylum: Arthropoda
- Class: Insecta
- Order: Coleoptera
- Suborder: Polyphaga
- Infraorder: Cucujiformia
- Family: Cerambycidae
- Genus: Hybolasius
- Species: H. thoracicus

Binomial name
- Hybolasius thoracicus Broun, 1893

Species of beetle

Hybolasius thoracicus is a species of beetle in the family Cerambycidae. It was described by Broun in 1893. It is known from New Zealand.
