= Hypsioma =

Scientific classification
- Kingdom: Animalia
- Phylum: Arthropoda
- Class: Insecta
- Order: Coleoptera
- Suborder: Polyphaga
- Infraorder: Cucujiformia
- Family: Cerambycidae
- Subfamily: Lamiinae
- Tribe: Onciderini
- Genus: Hypsioma; Audinet-Serville, 1835

Genus of beetles

Hypsioma is a genus of longhorn beetles of the subfamily Lamiinae, containing the following species:

- Hypsioma affinis Thomson, 1860
- Hypsioma amydon Dillon & Dillon, 1945
- Hypsioma aristonia Dillon & Dillon, 1945
- Hypsioma asthenia Martins & Galileo, 1990
- Hypsioma attalia Dillon & Dillon, 1945
- Hypsioma bahiensis Martins & Galileo, 2010
- Hypsioma barbara Martins & Galileo, 1990
- Hypsioma basalis Thomson, 1860
- Hypsioma carioca Martins & Galileo, 2007
- Hypsioma cariua Galileo & Martins, 2007
- Hypsioma chapadensis Dillon & Dillon, 1945
- Hypsioma charila Dillon & Dillon, 1945
- Hypsioma constellata Thomson, 1868
- Hypsioma dejeanii Thomson, 1868
- Hypsioma gibbera Audinet-Serville, 1835
- Hypsioma grisea (Fleutiaux & Sallé, 1889)
- Hypsioma hezia Dillon & Dillon, 1945
- Hypsioma inornata Thomson, 1868
- Hypsioma lyca Dillon & Dillon, 1945
- Hypsioma nesiope Dillon & Dillon, 1945
- Hypsioma opalina Dillon & Dillon, 1945
- Hypsioma pylades Dillon & Dillon, 1945
- Hypsioma renatoi Martins & Galileo, 1990
- Hypsioma rimosa Dillon & Dillon, 1945
- Hypsioma robusta Dillon & Dillon, 1945
- Hypsioma solangeae Galileo & Martins, 2007
- Hypsioma sororcula Martins, 1981
- Hypsioma steinbachi Dillon & Dillon, 1945
- Hypsioma viridis Gilmour, 1950
