= Hybolasius dubius =

Scientific classification
- Kingdom: Animalia
- Phylum: Arthropoda
- Class: Insecta
- Order: Coleoptera
- Suborder: Polyphaga
- Infraorder: Cucujiformia
- Family: Cerambycidae
- Genus: Hybolasius
- Species: H. dubius

Binomial name
- Hybolasius dubius Broun, 1893

Synonyms
- Hybolasius lineiceps Broun, 1914

Species of beetle

Hybolasius dubius is a species of beetle in the family Cerambycidae. It was described by Broun in 1893. It is known from New Zealand.
