= Hybolasiopsis =

Scientific classification
- Kingdom: Animalia
- Phylum: Arthropoda
- Class: Insecta
- Order: Coleoptera
- Suborder: Polyphaga
- Infraorder: Cucujiformia
- Family: Cerambycidae
- Genus: Hybolasiopsis
- Species: H. abnormalis

Binomial name
- Hybolasiopsis abnormalis (Sharp, 1903)

Synonyms
- Hybolasius trigonellaris Hutton, 1898; Xylotoles abnormalis Sharp, 1903; Hybolasiopsis abnormalis (Sharp, 1903)

Genus of beetles

Hybolasiopsis abnormalis is a species of beetle in the family Cerambycidae, and the only species in the genus Hybolasiopsis. It was first formally described by Frederick Hutton in 1898, as a member of the genus Hybolasius. David Sharp transferred it to Hybolasiopsis in 1903.
