= Hypsioma charila =

Scientific classification
- Kingdom: Animalia
- Phylum: Arthropoda
- Clade: Pancrustacea
- Class: Insecta
- Order: Coleoptera
- Suborder: Polyphaga
- Infraorder: Cucujiformia
- Family: Cerambycidae
- Genus: Hypsioma
- Species: H. charila

Binomial name
- Hypsioma charila Dillon & Dillon, 1945

Species of beetle

Hypsioma charila is a species of beetle in the family Cerambycidae. It was described by Dillon and Dillon in 1945. It is known from Brazil (Minas Gerais, Rio de Janeiro, São Paulo, Paraná) and Paraguay.
