= Callipogonius =

Scientific classification
- Kingdom: Animalia
- Phylum: Arthropoda
- Class: Insecta
- Order: Coleoptera
- Suborder: Polyphaga
- Infraorder: Cucujiformia
- Family: Cerambycidae
- Tribe: Pogonocherini
- Genus: Callipogonius; Linsley, 1935

Genus of beetles

Callipogonius is a genus of longhorn beetles of the subfamily Lamiinae, containing the following species:

== Species ==
- Callipogonius cornutus (Linsley, 1930)
- Callipogonius hircinus (Bates, 1885)
