= Hypsioma pylades =

Scientific classification
- Kingdom: Animalia
- Phylum: Arthropoda
- Class: Insecta
- Order: Coleoptera
- Suborder: Polyphaga
- Infraorder: Cucujiformia
- Family: Cerambycidae
- Genus: Hypsioma
- Species: H. pylades

Binomial name
- Hypsioma pylades Dillon & Dillon, 1945

Synonyms
- Hypsioma basalis (Thomson) Zikán & Zikán, 1944

Species of beetle

Hypsioma pylades is a species of beetle in the family Cerambycidae. It was described by Dillon and Dillon in 1945. It is known from Brazil.
