= Hypsioma sororcula =

Scientific classification
- Kingdom: Animalia
- Phylum: Arthropoda
- Class: Insecta
- Order: Coleoptera
- Suborder: Polyphaga
- Infraorder: Cucujiformia
- Family: Cerambycidae
- Genus: Hypsioma
- Species: H. sororcula

Binomial name
- Hypsioma sororcula Martins, 1981

Species of beetle

Hypsioma sororcula is a species of beetle in the family Cerambycidae. It was described by Martins in 1981. It is known from Brazil.
