= Hypsioma constellata =

Scientific classification
- Kingdom: Animalia
- Phylum: Arthropoda
- Class: Insecta
- Order: Coleoptera
- Suborder: Polyphaga
- Infraorder: Cucujiformia
- Family: Cerambycidae
- Genus: Hypsioma
- Species: H. constellata

Binomial name
- Hypsioma constellata Thomson, 1868

Species of beetle

Hypsioma constellata is a species of beetle in the family Cerambycidae. It was described by James Thomson in 1868. It is known from Brazil and French Guiana.
