= Hybolasius promissus =

Scientific classification
- Kingdom: Animalia
- Phylum: Arthropoda
- Class: Insecta
- Order: Coleoptera
- Suborder: Polyphaga
- Infraorder: Cucujiformia
- Family: Cerambycidae
- Genus: Hybolasius
- Species: H. promissus

Binomial name
- Hybolasius promissus Broun, 1880

Synonyms
- Hybolasius apicalis Broun, 1886; Hybolasius piceus Broun, 1886

Species of beetle

Hybolasius promissus is a species of beetle in the family Cerambycidae. It was described by Broun in 1880. It is known from New Zealand.
