= Poliaenus =

Scientific classification
- Domain: Eukaryota
- Kingdom: Animalia
- Phylum: Arthropoda
- Class: Insecta
- Order: Coleoptera
- Suborder: Polyphaga
- Infraorder: Cucujiformia
- Family: Cerambycidae
- Tribe: Pogonocherini
- Genus: Poliaenus

Genus of beetles

Poliaenus is a genus of longhorn beetles of the subfamily Lamiinae, containing the following species:

- Poliaenus abietis Tyson, 1968
- Poliaenus batesi Linsley, 1933
- Poliaenus californicus (Schaeffer, 1908)
- Poliaenus concolor (Schaeffer, 1909)
- Poliaenus hesperus Chemsak & Linsley, 1988
- Poliaenus negundo (Schaeffer, 1905)
- Poliaenus nuevoleonis Chemsak & Linsley, 1975
- Poliaenus obscurus (Fall, 1910)
- Poliaenus oregonus (LeConte, 1861)
- Poliaenus sparsus Chemsak & Linsley, 1975
- Poliaenus volitans (LeConte, 1873)
