= Hybolasius genalis =

Scientific classification
- Kingdom: Animalia
- Phylum: Arthropoda
- Class: Insecta
- Order: Coleoptera
- Suborder: Polyphaga
- Infraorder: Cucujiformia
- Family: Cerambycidae
- Genus: Hybolasius
- Species: H. genalis

Binomial name
- Hybolasius genalis Broun, 1903

Species of beetle

Hybolasius genalis is a species of beetle in the family Cerambycidae. It was described by Broun in 1903. It is known from New Zealand. It contains the varietas Hybolasius genalis var. tumidellus.
