= Pygmaeopsis viticola =

Scientific classification
- Kingdom: Animalia
- Phylum: Arthropoda
- Class: Insecta
- Order: Coleoptera
- Family: Cerambycidae
- Subfamily: Lamiinae
- Tribe: Pogonocherini
- Genus: Pygmaeopsis
- Species: P. viticola

Binomial name
- Pygmaeopsis viticola Schaeffer, 1908

Species of beetle

Pygmaeopsis viticola is a species of beetle in the family Cerambycidae, and the only species in the genus Pygmaeopsis. It was described by Schaeffer in 1908.
