= Hybolasius vegetus =

Scientific classification
- Kingdom: Animalia
- Phylum: Arthropoda
- Class: Insecta
- Order: Coleoptera
- Suborder: Polyphaga
- Infraorder: Cucujiformia
- Family: Cerambycidae
- Genus: Hybolasius
- Species: H. vegetus

Binomial name
- Hybolasius vegetus Broun, 1881

Synonyms
- Hybolasius albihirtus Broun, 1893

Species of beetle

Hybolasius vegetus is a species of beetle in the family Cerambycidae. It was described by Broun in 1881. It is known from New Zealand.
