= Hybolasius modestus =

Scientific classification
- Kingdom: Animalia
- Phylum: Arthropoda
- Class: Insecta
- Order: Coleoptera
- Suborder: Polyphaga
- Infraorder: Cucujiformia
- Family: Cerambycidae
- Genus: Hybolasius
- Species: H. modestus

Binomial name
- Hybolasius modestus Broun, 1880

Species of beetle

Hybolasius modestus is a species of beetle in the family Cerambycidae. It was described by Broun in 1880. It is known from New Zealand.
