= Hypsioma gibbera =

Scientific classification
- Kingdom: Animalia
- Phylum: Arthropoda
- Class: Insecta
- Order: Coleoptera
- Suborder: Polyphaga
- Infraorder: Cucujiformia
- Family: Cerambycidae
- Genus: Hypsioma
- Species: H. gibbera

Binomial name
- Hypsioma gibbera Audinet-Serville, 1835

Synonyms
- Trachysomus gibber Castelnau, 1840

Species of beetle

Hypsioma gibbera is a species of beetle in the family Cerambycidae. It was described by Audinet-Serville in 1835. It is known from Argentina, Brazil and Paraguay.
