= Hybolasius fasciatus =

Scientific classification
- Kingdom: Animalia
- Phylum: Arthropoda
- Class: Insecta
- Order: Coleoptera
- Suborder: Polyphaga
- Infraorder: Cucujiformia
- Family: Cerambycidae
- Genus: Hybolasius
- Species: H. fasciatus

Binomial name
- Hybolasius fasciatus Broun, 1881

Species of beetle

Hybolasius fasciatus is a species of beetle in the family Cerambycidae. It was described by Broun in 1881. It is known from New Zealand.
