= Ecyrus lineicollis =

Scientific classification
- Kingdom: Animalia
- Phylum: Arthropoda
- Class: Insecta
- Order: Coleoptera
- Suborder: Polyphaga
- Infraorder: Cucujiformia
- Family: Cerambycidae
- Genus: Ecyrus
- Species: E. lineicollis

Binomial name
- Ecyrus lineicollis Chemsak & Linsley, 1975

Species of beetle

Ecyrus lineicollis is a species of beetle in the family Cerambycidae. It was described by Chemsak and Linsley in 1975. It is known from Mexico.
