= Ecyrus pacificus =

Scientific classification
- Kingdom: Animalia
- Phylum: Arthropoda
- Class: Insecta
- Order: Coleoptera
- Suborder: Polyphaga
- Infraorder: Cucujiformia
- Family: Cerambycidae
- Genus: Ecyrus
- Species: E. pacificus

Binomial name
- Ecyrus pacificus Linsley, 1942

Species of beetle

Ecyrus pacificus is a species of beetle in the family Cerambycidae. It was described by Linsley in 1942. It is known from Mexico.
