= Hypsioma viridis =

Scientific classification
- Kingdom: Animalia
- Phylum: Arthropoda
- Class: Insecta
- Order: Coleoptera
- Suborder: Polyphaga
- Infraorder: Cucujiformia
- Family: Cerambycidae
- Genus: Hypsioma
- Species: H. viridis

Binomial name
- Hypsioma viridis Gilmour, 1950

Species of beetle

Hypsioma viridis is a species of beetle in the family Cerambycidae. It was described by E. Forrest Gilmour in 1950. It is known from Brazil.
