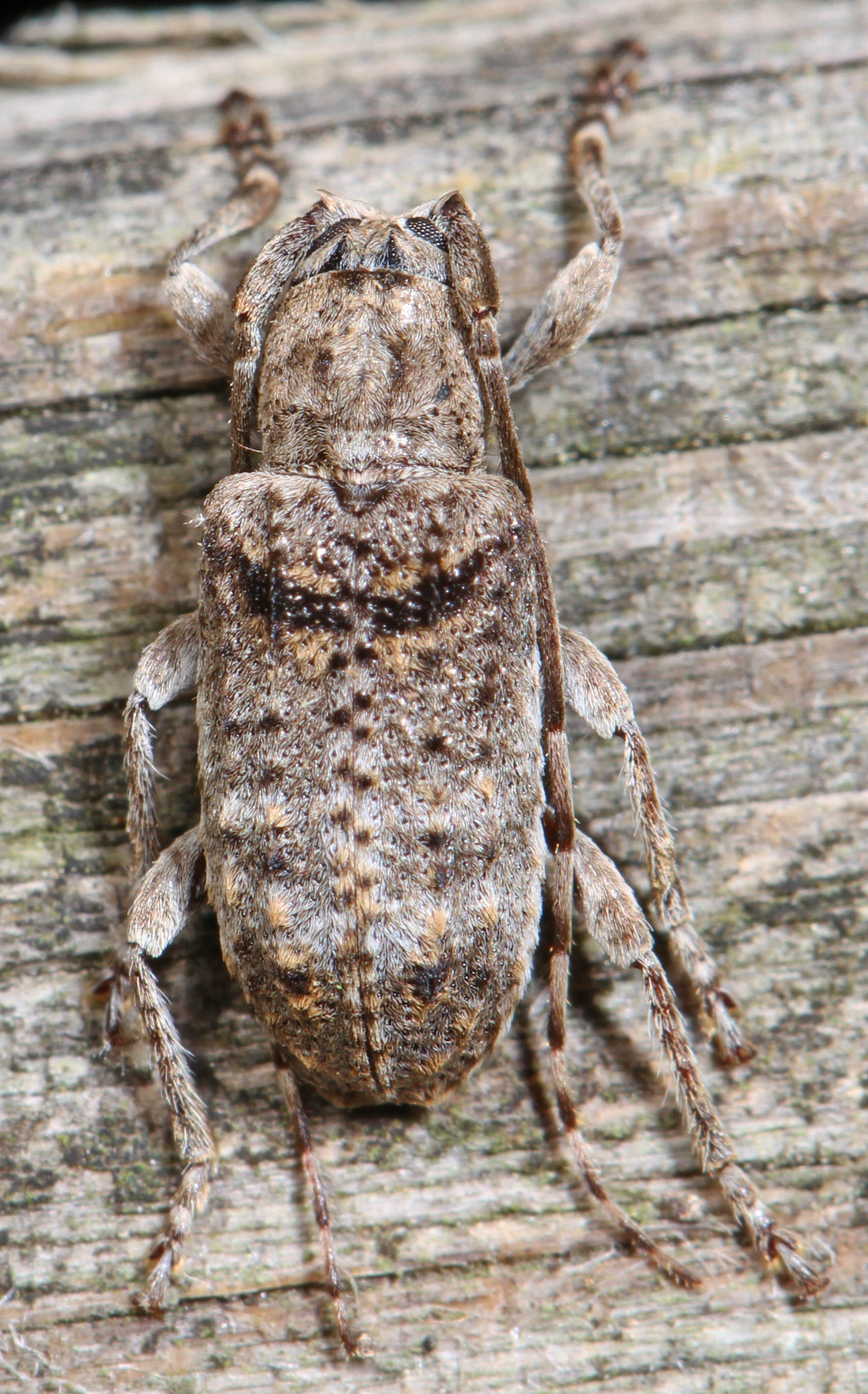

Scientific classification
- Kingdom: Animalia
- Phylum: Arthropoda
- Class: Insecta
- Order: Coleoptera
- Suborder: Polyphaga
- Infraorder: Cucujiformia
- Family: Cerambycidae
- Genus: Ecyrus
- Species: E. dasycerus

Binomial name
- Ecyrus dasycerus (Say, 1827)

= Ecyrus dasycerus =

Species of beetle

Ecyrus dasycerus is a species of beetle in the family Cerambycidae. It was described by Say in 1827.

== Subspecies ==
- Ecyrus dasycerus dasycerus (Say, 1827)
- Ecyrus dasycerus floridanus Linsley, 1935
