= Hypsioma carioca =

Scientific classification
- Kingdom: Animalia
- Phylum: Arthropoda
- Class: Insecta
- Order: Coleoptera
- Suborder: Polyphaga
- Infraorder: Cucujiformia
- Family: Cerambycidae
- Genus: Hypsioma
- Species: H. carioca

Binomial name
- Hypsioma carioca Martins & Galileo, 2007

Species of beetle

Hypsioma carioca is a species of beetle in the family Cerambycidae. It was described by Martins and Galileo in 2007. It is known from Brazil.
