= Hypsioma solangeae =

Scientific classification
- Kingdom: Animalia
- Phylum: Arthropoda
- Class: Insecta
- Order: Coleoptera
- Suborder: Polyphaga
- Infraorder: Cucujiformia
- Family: Cerambycidae
- Genus: Hypsioma
- Species: H. solangeae

Binomial name
- Hypsioma solangeae Galileo & Martins, 2007

Species of beetle

Hypsioma solangeae is a species of beetle in the family Cerambycidae. It was described by Galileo and Martins in 2007. It is known from Brazil.
