= Zaplous baracutey =

Scientific classification
- Kingdom: Animalia
- Phylum: Arthropoda
- Class: Insecta
- Order: Coleoptera
- Suborder: Polyphaga
- Infraorder: Cucujiformia
- Family: Cerambycidae
- Genus: Zaplous
- Species: Z. baracutey

Binomial name
- Zaplous baracutey Zayas, 1975

Species of beetle

Zaplous baracutey is a species of beetle in the family Cerambycidae. It was described by Zayas in 1975. It is known from Cuba.
