= Hypsioma nesiope =

Scientific classification
- Kingdom: Animalia
- Phylum: Arthropoda
- Class: Insecta
- Order: Coleoptera
- Suborder: Polyphaga
- Infraorder: Cucujiformia
- Family: Cerambycidae
- Genus: Hypsioma
- Species: H. nesiope

Binomial name
- Hypsioma nesiope Dillon & Dillon, 1945

Species of beetle

Hypsioma nesiope is a species of beetle in the family Cerambycidae. It was described by Dillon and Dillon in 1945. It is known from Colombia and Panama.
