= Alphomorphus =

Scientific classification
- Domain: Eukaryota
- Kingdom: Animalia
- Phylum: Arthropoda
- Class: Insecta
- Order: Coleoptera
- Suborder: Polyphaga
- Infraorder: Cucujiformia
- Family: Cerambycidae
- Tribe: Pogonocherini
- Genus: Alphomorphus; Linsley, 1935
- Species: A. vandykei

Binomial name
- Alphomorphus vandykei (Linsley, 1930)

Genus of beetles

Alphomorphus vandykei is a species of beetle in the family Cerambycidae, and the only species in the genus Alphomorphus. It was described by Linsley in 1930.
