= Callipogonius cornutus =

Scientific classification
- Kingdom: Animalia
- Phylum: Arthropoda
- Class: Insecta
- Order: Coleoptera
- Suborder: Polyphaga
- Infraorder: Cucujiformia
- Family: Cerambycidae
- Genus: Callipogonius
- Species: C. cornutus

Binomial name
- Callipogonius cornutus (Linsley, 1930)

Species of beetle

Callipogonius cornutus is a species of beetle in the family Cerambycidae. It was described by Linsley in 1930. It is known from United States and Mexico.
