= Poliaenus volitans =

Scientific classification
- Kingdom: Animalia
- Phylum: Arthropoda
- Clade: Pancrustacea
- Class: Insecta
- Order: Coleoptera
- Suborder: Polyphaga
- Infraorder: Cucujiformia
- Family: Cerambycidae
- Genus: Poliaenus
- Species: P. volitans

Binomial name
- Poliaenus volitans (LeConte, 1873)

Species of beetle

Poliaenus volitans is a species of beetle in the family Cerambycidae. It was described by John Lawrence LeConte in 1873. It is known from Guatemala and Mexico.
