= Hypsioma inornata =

Scientific classification
- Kingdom: Animalia
- Phylum: Arthropoda
- Class: Insecta
- Order: Coleoptera
- Suborder: Polyphaga
- Infraorder: Cucujiformia
- Family: Cerambycidae
- Genus: Hypsioma
- Species: H. inornata

Binomial name
- Hypsioma inornata Thomson, 1868

Species of beetle

Hypsioma inornata is a species of beetle in the family Cerambycidae, described by James Thomson in 1868.
