= Zaplous =

Scientific classification
- Kingdom: Animalia
- Phylum: Arthropoda
- Class: Insecta
- Order: Coleoptera
- Suborder: Polyphaga
- Infraorder: Cucujiformia
- Family: Cerambycidae
- Tribe: Pogonocherini
- Genus: Zaplous; LeConte, 1878

Genus of beetles

Zaplous is a genus of longhorn beetles of the subfamily Lamiinae, containing the following species:

- Zaplous annulatus (Chevrolat, 1862)
- Zaplous baracutey Zayas, 1975
