= Ecyrus penicillatus =

Scientific classification
- Kingdom: Animalia
- Phylum: Arthropoda
- Class: Insecta
- Order: Coleoptera
- Suborder: Polyphaga
- Infraorder: Cucujiformia
- Family: Cerambycidae
- Genus: Ecyrus
- Species: E. penicillatus

Binomial name
- Ecyrus penicillatus Bates, 1880

Species of beetle

Ecyrus penicillatus is a species of beetle in the family Cerambycidae. It was described by Henry Walter Bates in 1880. It is known from Guatemala, Honduras, the United States and Mexico.
