= Hybolasius lanipes =

Scientific classification
- Kingdom: Animalia
- Phylum: Arthropoda
- Class: Insecta
- Order: Coleoptera
- Suborder: Polyphaga
- Infraorder: Cucujiformia
- Family: Cerambycidae
- Genus: Hybolasius
- Species: H. lanipes

Binomial name
- Hybolasius lanipes Sharp, 1877

Species of beetle

Hybolasius lanipes is a species of beetle in the family Cerambycidae. It was described by Sharp in 1877. It is known from New Zealand.
