= Lophopogonius =

Scientific classification
- Kingdom: Animalia
- Phylum: Arthropoda
- Class: Insecta
- Order: Coleoptera
- Suborder: Polyphaga
- Infraorder: Cucujiformia
- Family: Cerambycidae
- Tribe: Pogonocherini
- Genus: Lophopogonius; Linsley, 1935
- Species: L. crinitus

Binomial name
- Lophopogonius crinitus (LeConte, 1873)

Genus of beetles

Lophopogonius is a monotypic beetle genus in the family Cerambycidae described by Linsley in 1935. Its only species, Lophopogonius crinitus, was described by John Lawrence LeConte in 1873.
