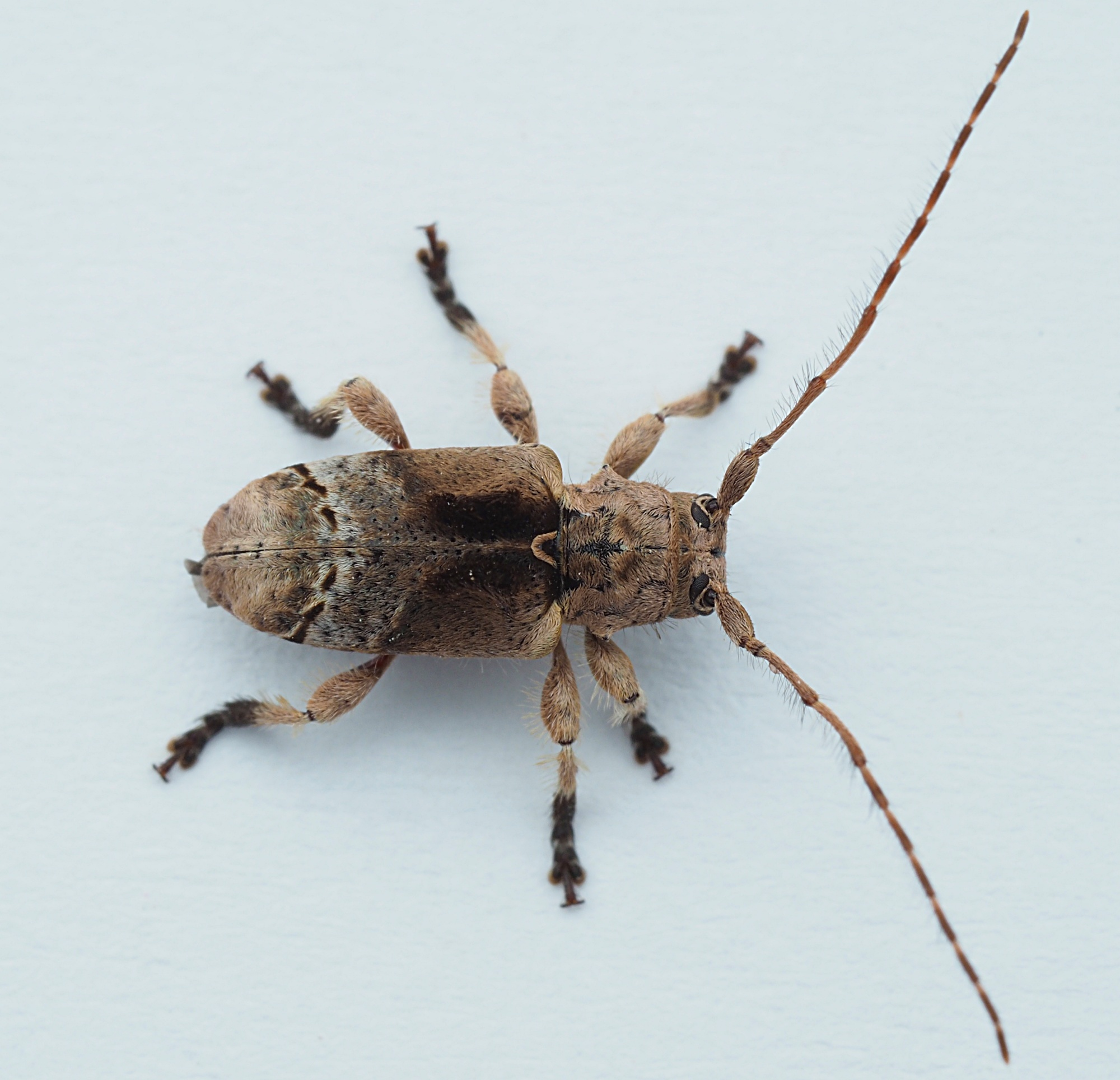
- Hybolasius crista

Scientific classification
- Kingdom: Animalia
- Phylum: Arthropoda
- Class: Insecta
- Order: Coleoptera
- Suborder: Polyphaga
- Infraorder: Cucujiformia
- Family: Cerambycidae
- Subfamily: Lamiinae
- Tribe: Pogonocherini
- Genus: Hybolasius; Bates, 1874

= Hybolasius =

Genus of beetles

Hybolasius is a genus of longhorn beetles of the subfamily Lamiinae, containing the following species:

- Hybolasius brevicollis Broun, 1883
- Hybolasius castaneus Broun, 1893
- Hybolasius crista (Fabricius, 1775)
- Hybolasius cristatellus Bates, 1876
- Hybolasius dubius Broun, 1893
- Hybolasius fasciatus Broun, 1881
- Hybolasius femoralis Broun, 1893
- Hybolasius genalis Broun, 1903
- Hybolasius gnarus Broun, 1893
- Hybolasius gracilipes Broun, 1903
- Hybolasius lanipes Sharp, 1877
- Hybolasius laticollis Broun, 1903
- Hybolasius modestior Breuning, 1940
- Hybolasius modestus Broun, 1880
- Hybolasius optatus Broun, 1893
- Hybolasius parvus Broun, 1880
- Hybolasius pedator Bates, 1876
- Hybolasius pictitarsis Broun, 1883
- Hybolasius postfasciatus Breuning, 1940
- Hybolasius promissus Broun, 1880
- Hybolasius pumilus (Pascoe, 1876)
- Hybolasius rufescens Broun, 1893
- Hybolasius sinuatofasciatus Breuning, 1940
- Hybolasius thoracicus Broun, 1893
- Hybolasius trigonellaris Hutton, 1898
- Hybolasius vegetus Broun, 1881
- Hybolasius viridescens Bates, 1874
- Hybolasius wakefieldi Bates, 1876
