= Soluta gramineoides =

Scientific classification
- Kingdom: Animalia
- Phylum: Arthropoda
- Class: Insecta
- Order: Coleoptera
- Suborder: Polyphaga
- Infraorder: Cucujiformia
- Family: Cerambycidae
- Subfamily: Lamiinae
- Tribe: Pogonocherini
- Genus: Soluta; Lacordaire, 1872
- Species: S. gramineoides

Binomial name
- Soluta gramineoides Lacordaire, 1872

Species of beetle

Soluta gramineoides is a species of beetle in the family Cerambycidae, and the only species in the genus Soluta. It was described by Lacordaire in 1872.
