= Spinohybolasius =

Scientific classification
- Kingdom: Animalia
- Phylum: Arthropoda
- Class: Insecta
- Order: Coleoptera
- Suborder: Polyphaga
- Infraorder: Cucujiformia
- Family: Cerambycidae
- Genus: Spinohybolasius
- Species: S. spinicollis

Binomial name
- Spinohybolasius spinicollis Breuning, 1959

Genus of beetles

Spinohybolasius spinicollis is a species of beetle in the family Cerambycidae, and the only species in the genus Spinohybolasius. It was described by Stephan von Breuning in 1959.
