= Lypsimena =

Scientific classification
- Kingdom: Animalia
- Phylum: Arthropoda
- Class: Insecta
- Order: Coleoptera
- Suborder: Polyphaga
- Infraorder: Cucujiformia
- Family: Cerambycidae
- Subfamily: Lamiinae
- Tribe: Pogonocherini
- Genus: Lypsimena; Haldeman, 1847

Genus of beetles

Lypsimena is a genus of longhorn beetles of the subfamily Lamiinae,

== Species ==
- Lypsimena fuscata Haldeman, 1847
- Lypsimena nodipennis (Burmeister, 1865)
- Lypsimena proletaria (Melzer, 1931)
- Lypsimena strandiella Breuning, 1943
- Lypsimena tomentosa Chemsak & Linsley, 1978
