= Estoloderces =

Scientific classification
- Kingdom: Animalia
- Phylum: Arthropoda
- Clade: Pancrustacea
- Class: Insecta
- Order: Coleoptera
- Suborder: Polyphaga
- Infraorder: Cucujiformia
- Family: Cerambycidae
- Genus: Estoloderces
- Species: E. luederwaldti

Binomial name
- Estoloderces luederwaldti Melzer, 1928

Genus of beetles

Estoloderces luederwaldti is a species of beetle in the family Cerambycidae, and the only species in the genus Estoloderces. It was described by Melzer in 1928. It is found in Brazil (Minas Gerais, Espírito Santo, Rio de Janeiro, São Paulo, Paraná, Santa Catarina, Rio Grande do Sul), Bolivia (Santa Cruz) and Paraguay.
