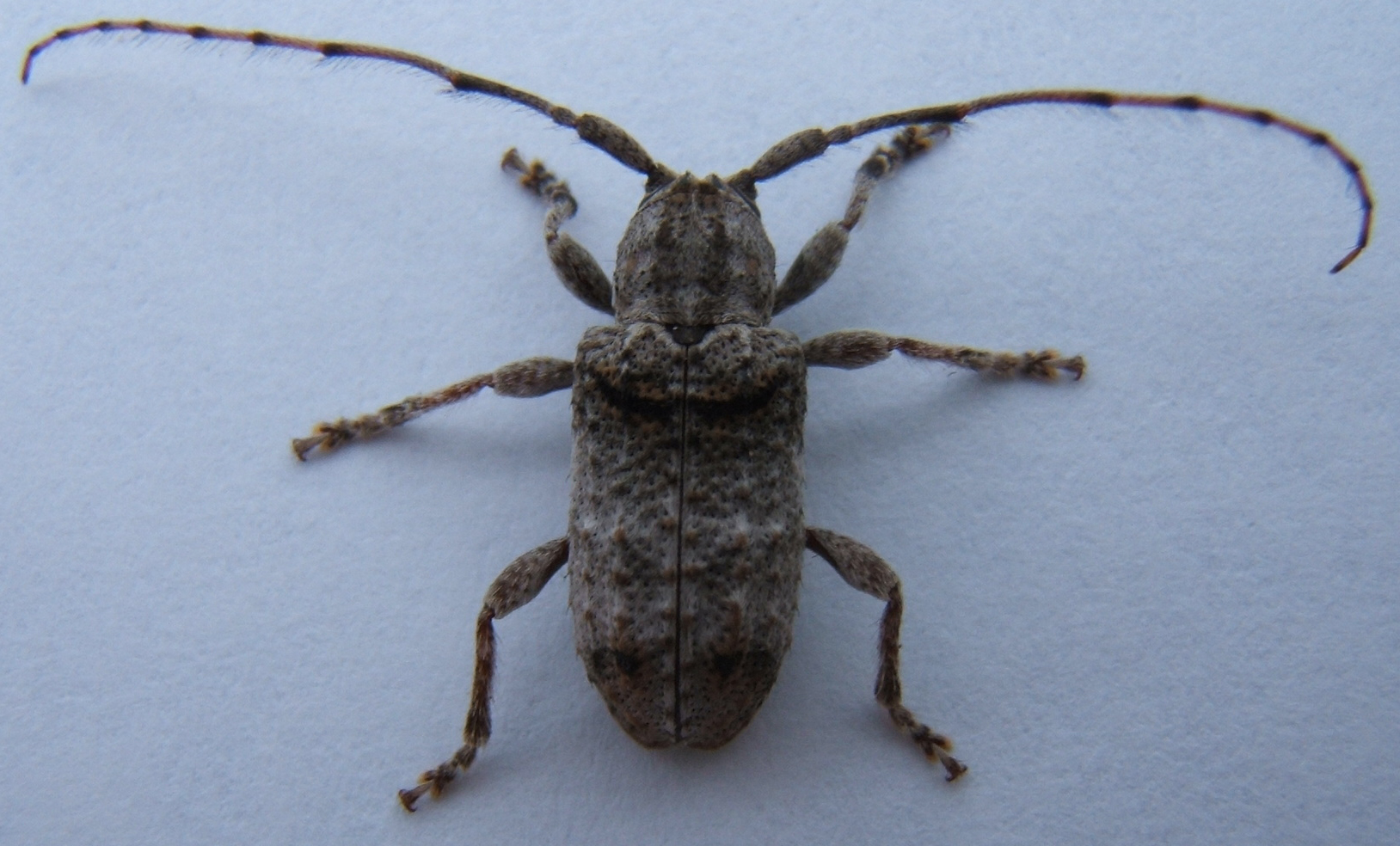
- Ecyrus arcuatus

Scientific classification
- Kingdom: Animalia
- Phylum: Arthropoda
- Class: Insecta
- Order: Coleoptera
- Suborder: Polyphaga
- Infraorder: Cucujiformia
- Family: Cerambycidae
- Subfamily: Lamiinae
- Tribe: Pogonocherini
- Genus: Ecyrus; LeConte, 1852

= Ecyrus =

Genus of insects

Ecyrus is a genus of longhorn beetles of the subfamily Lamiinae.

== Species ==
- Ecyrus albifrons Chemsak & Linsley, 1975
- Ecyrus arcuatus Gahan, 1892
- Ecyrus ciliatus Chemsak & Linsley, 1975
- Ecyrus dasycerus (Say, 1827)
- Ecyrus hirtipes Gahan, 1895
- Ecyrus lineicollis Chemsak & Linsley, 1975
- Ecyrus pacificus Linsley, 1942
- Ecyrus penicillatus Bates, 1880
