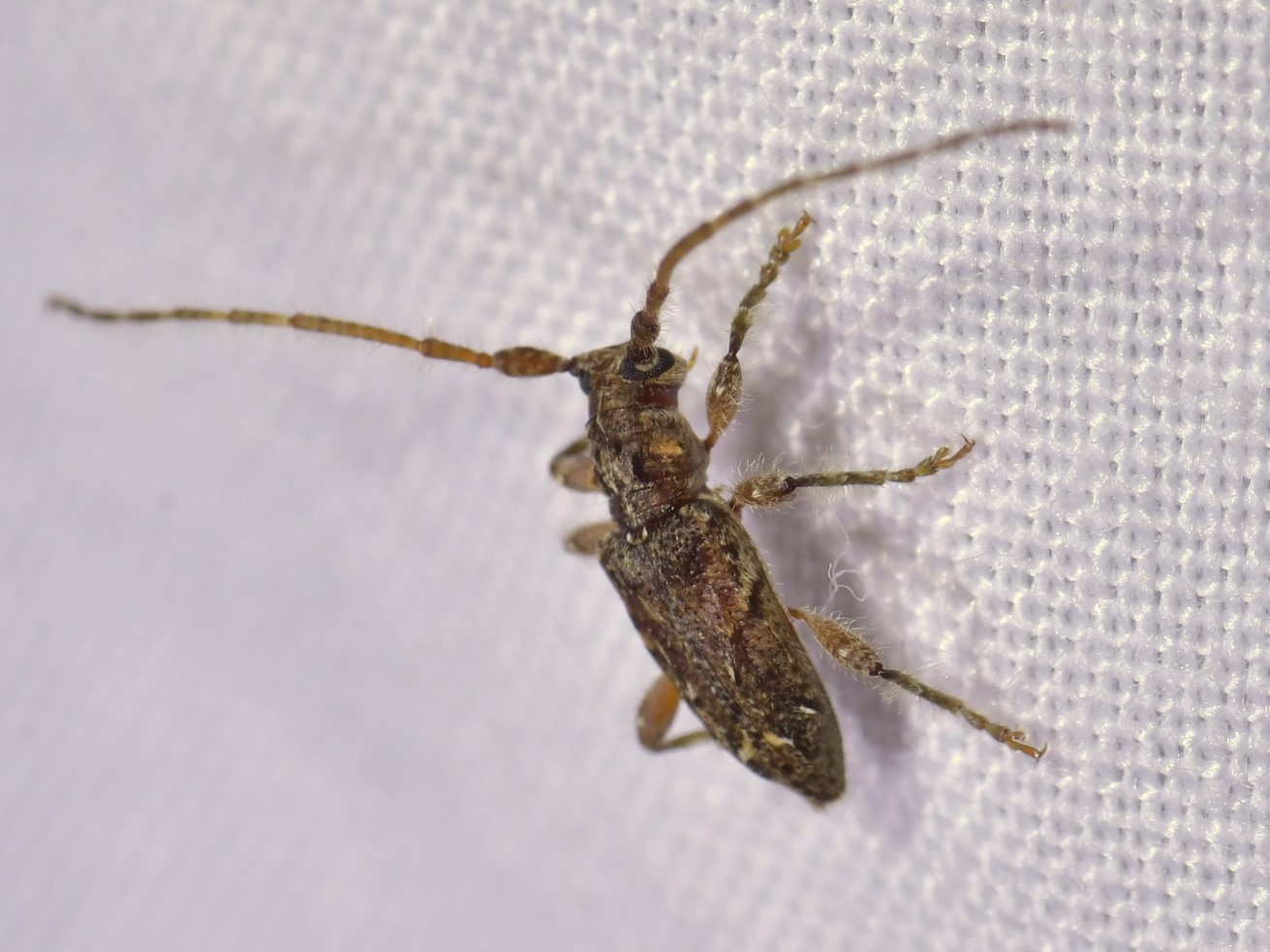

Scientific classification
- Kingdom: Animalia
- Phylum: Arthropoda
- Class: Insecta
- Order: Coleoptera
- Suborder: Polyphaga
- Infraorder: Cucujiformia
- Family: Cerambycidae
- Genus: Hybolasiellus; Breuning, 1959
- Species: H. variegatus

Binomial name
- Hybolasiellus variegatus (Broun, 1880)

Synonyms
- (Species): Hybolasius variegatus Broun, 1880; Hybolasius capiendus Broun, 1913; Xylotoles gaudens Broun, 1893; Hybolasius varipes Broun, 1909

= Hybolasiellus =

Genus of beetles

Hybolasiellus is a genus of beetles in the family Cerambycidae. It is monotypic, being represented by the single species Hybolasiellus variegatus. It was first described by Broun in 1880.
