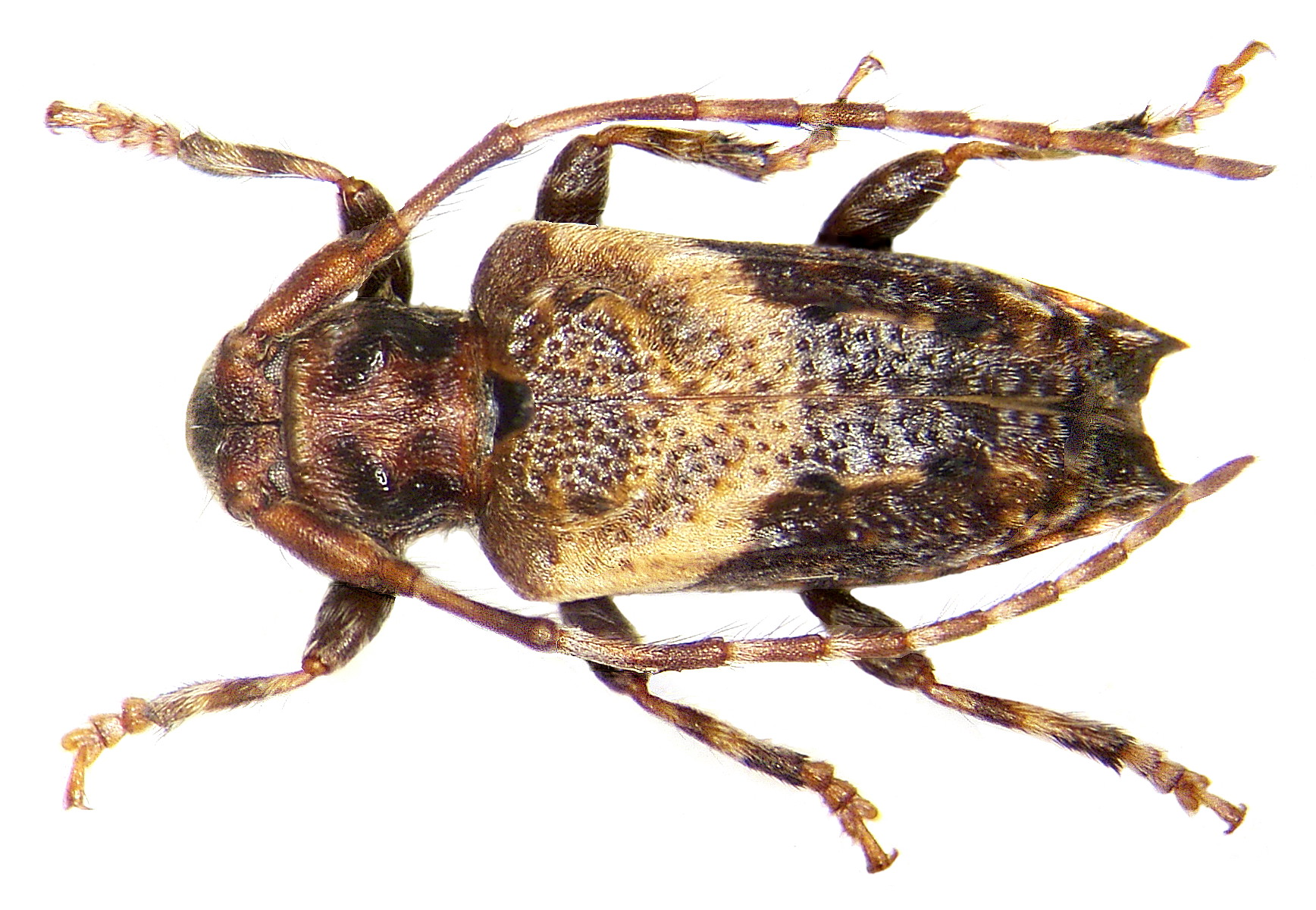
- Cerambycidae Grösse 4-6 mm.

Scientific classification
- Kingdom: Animalia
- Phylum: Arthropoda
- Class: Insecta
- Order: Coleoptera
- Suborder: Polyphaga
- Infraorder: Cucujiformia
- Family: Cerambycidae
- Subfamily: Lamiinae
- Tribe: Pogonocherini; Mulsant, 1839

= Pogonocherini =

Tribe of beetles

Pogonocherini is a tribe of longhorn beetles of the subfamily Lamiinae.

== Taxonomy ==
- Alphomorphus Linsley, 1935
- Callipogonius Linsley, 1935
- Cristhybolasius Breuning, 1959
- Ecteneolus Bates, 1885
- Ecyrus LeConte, 1852
- Estoloderces Melzer, 1928
- Hybolasiellus Breuning, 1959
- Hybolasiopsis Breuning, 1959
- Hybolasius Bates, 1874
- Hypomia Thomson, 1868
- Lophopogonius Linsley, 1935
- Lypsimena Haldeman, 1847
- Pogonocherus Dejean, 1821
- Poliaenus Bates, 1880
- Polyacanthia Montrouzier, 1861
- Pygmaeopsis Schaeffer, 1908
- Soluta Lacordaire, 1872
- Spinohybolasius Breuning, 1959
- Zaplous LeConte, 1878
