= RiAFP =

Antifreeze protein

RiAFP refers to an antifreeze protein (AFP) produced by the Rhagium inquisitor longhorned beetle. It is a type V antifreeze protein with a molecular weight of 12.8 kDa; this type of AFP is noted for its hyperactivity. R. inquisitor is a freeze-avoidant species, meaning that, due to its AFP, R. inquisitor prevents its body fluids from freezing altogether. This contrasts with freeze-tolerant species, whose AFPs simply depress levels of ice crystal formation in low temperatures. Whereas most insect antifreeze proteins contain cysteines at least every sixth residue, as well as varying numbers of 12- or 13-mer repeats of 8.3-12.5kDa, RiAFP is notable for containing only one disulfide bridge. This property of RiAFP makes it particularly attractive for recombinant expression and biotechnological applications.

== AFPs ==
AFPs work through an interaction with small ice crystals that is similar to an enzyme-ligand binding mechanism which inhibits recrystallization of ice. This explanation of the interruption of the ice crystal structure by the AFP has come to be known as the adsorption-inhibition hypothesis.

According to this hypothesis, AFPs disrupt the thermodynamically favourable growth of an ice crystal via kinetic inhibition of contact between solid ice and liquid water. In this manner, the nucleation sites of the ice crystal lattice are blocked by the AFP, inhibiting the rapid growth of the crystal that could be fatal for the organism. In physical chemistry terms, the AFPs adsorbed onto the exposed ice crystal force the growth of the ice crystal in a convex fashion as the temperature drops, which elevates the ice vapour pressure at the nucleation sites. Ice vapour pressure continues to increase until it reaches equilibrium with the surrounding solution (water), at which point the growth of the ice crystal stops.

The aforementioned effect of AFPs on ice crystal nucleation is lost at the thermal hysteresis point. At a certain low temperature, the maximum convexity of the ice nucleation site is reached. Any further cooling will actually result in a "spreading" of the nucleation site away from this convex region, causing rapid, uncontrollable nucleation of the ice crystal. The temperature at which this phenomenon occurs is the thermal hysteresis point.
The adsorption-inhibition hypothesis is further supported by the observation that antifreeze activity increases with increasing AFP concentration – the more AFPs adsorb onto the forming ice crystal, the more 'crowded' these proteins become, making ice crystal nucleation less favourable.

In the R. inquisitor beetle, AFPs are found in the haemolymph, a fluid that bathes all the cells of the beetle and fills a cavity called the haemocoel. The presence of AFPs in R. inquisitor allows the tissues and fluids within the beetle to withstand freezing up to -30 °C (the thermal hysteresis point for this AFP). This strategy provides an obvious survival benefit to these beetles, who are endemic to cold climates, such as Scandinavia, Siberia, and Alaska.

== RiAFP Ice Binding ==
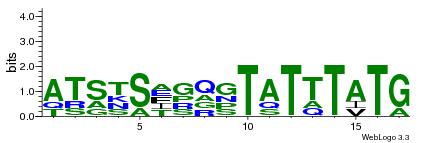
Figure 1: A sequence logo constructed from the 13-nucleotide repeat regions found by EBI-RADAR, showing a clear TxTxTxT binding motif embedded within these regions.

The primary structure of RiAFP (the sequence may be found here) determined by Mass Spectroscopy, Edman degradation and by constructing a partial cDNA sequence and PCR have shown that a TxTxTxT internal repeat exists. Sequence logos constructed from the RiAFP internal repeats, have been particularly helpful in the determination of the consensus sequence of these repeats. The TxTxTxT domains are irregularly spaced within the protein and have been shown to be conserved from the TxT binding motif of other AFPs. The hydroxyl moiety of the T residues fits well, when spaced as they are in the internal repeats, with the hydroxyl moieties of externally facing water molecules in the forming ice lattice. This mimics the formation of the growth cone at a nucleation site in the absence of AFPs. Thus, the binding of RiAFP inhibits the growth of the crystal in the basal and prism planes of the ice.

== RiAFP Predicted Structure ==
The fact that the binding motif appears as a "triplet" of the conserved TxT repeat, as well as the observation that blastp queries have returned no viable matches, has led some researchers to suggest that RiAFP represents a new type of AFP – one that differs from the heavily studied TmAFP (from T. molitor), DcAFP (from D. canadensis), and CfAFP (from C. fumiferana). On the basis of these observations, it has been predicted that the need for insect AFPs came about after insect evolutionary divergence, much like the evolution of fish AFPs; thus, different AFPs most likely evolved in parallel from adaptations to cold (environmental) stress. As a result, homology modelling with TmAFP, DcAFP, or CfAFP would prove to be fruitless.

Secondary structure modelling algorithms have determined that the internal repeats are spaced sufficiently to tend towards β-strand configuration; no helical regions include the conserved repeats; and all turn regions are located at the ends of β-strand regions. These data suggest that RiAFP is a well-folded β-helical protein, having six β-strand regions consisting of 13-amino acids (including one TxTxTxT binding motif) per strand.

Primary crystallographic studies, have been published on a RiAFP crystal (which diffracted to 1.3Å resolution) in the trigonal space group P3_{1}21 (or P3_{2}21), with unit-cell parameters a = b = 46.46, c = 193.21Å.
