= Ischnoceros rusticus =

Scientific classification
- Kingdom: Animalia
- Phylum: Arthropoda
- Class: Insecta
- Order: Hymenoptera
- Family: Ichneumonidae
- Genus: Ischnoceros
- Species: I. rusticus

Binomial name
- Ischnoceros rusticus (Geoffroy, 1785)

Species of wasp

Ischnoceros rusticus is a parasitoid wasp from ichneumonid family that parasitizes long-horned beetles of these species: Aromia moschata, Rhagium mordax, Rhagium bifasciatum, Saperda carcharias,.
