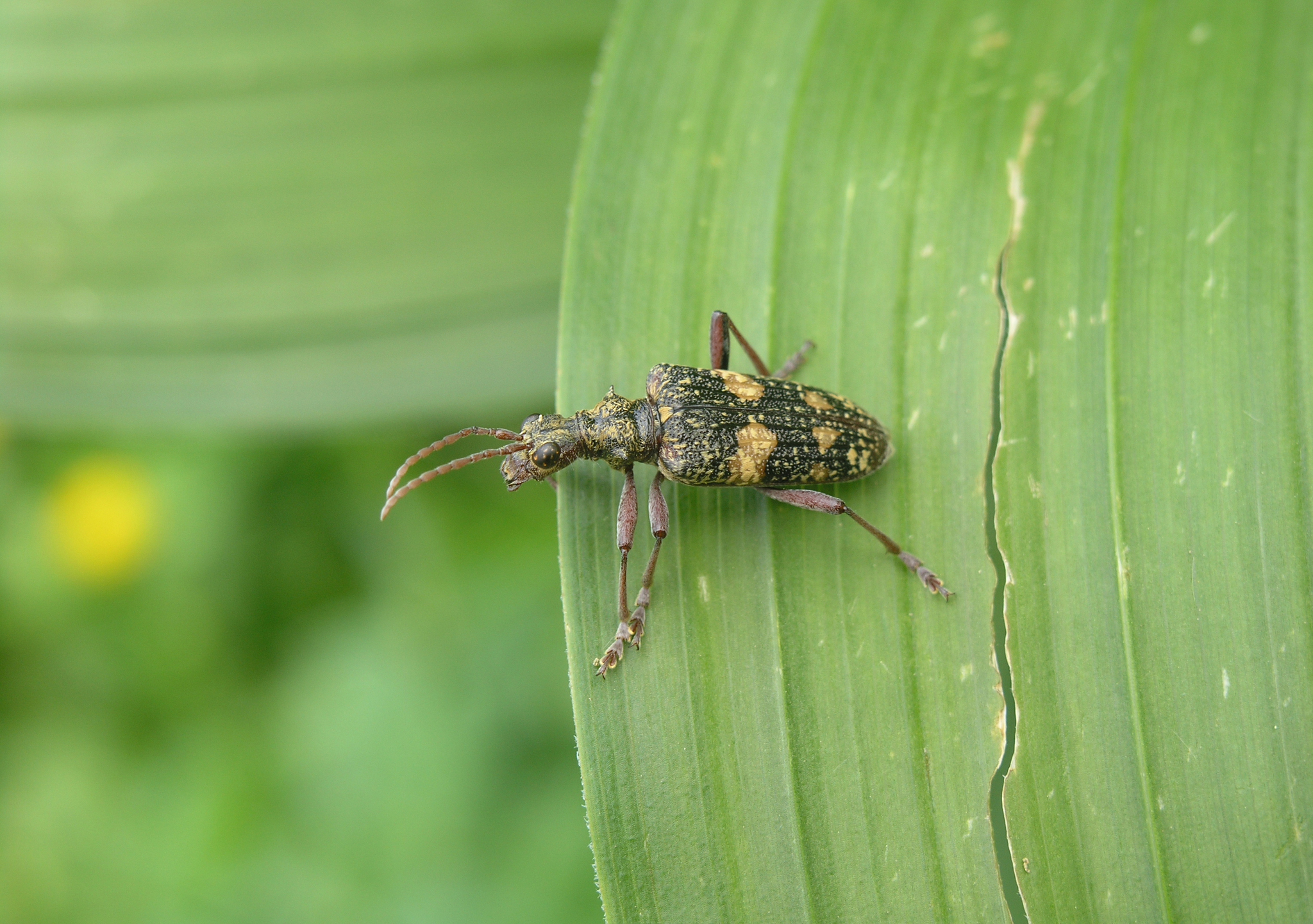

Scientific classification
- Kingdom: Animalia
- Phylum: Arthropoda
- Class: Insecta
- Order: Coleoptera
- Suborder: Polyphaga
- Infraorder: Cucujiformia
- Family: Cerambycidae
- Genus: Rhagium
- Species: R. fasciculatum

Binomial name
- Rhagium fasciculatum Faldermann, 1837

= Rhagium fasciculatum =

Species of beetle

Rhagium fasciculatum is a species of beetle in the family Cerambycidae. It was described by Faldermann in 1837.
