= Rhagium mexicanum =

Scientific classification
- Kingdom: Animalia
- Phylum: Arthropoda
- Class: Insecta
- Order: Coleoptera
- Suborder: Polyphaga
- Infraorder: Cucujiformia
- Family: Cerambycidae
- Genus: Rhagium
- Species: R. mexicanum

Binomial name
- Rhagium mexicanum Casey, 1913

Species of beetle

Rhagium mexicanum is a species of beetle in the family Cerambycidae. It was described by Casey in 1913.
