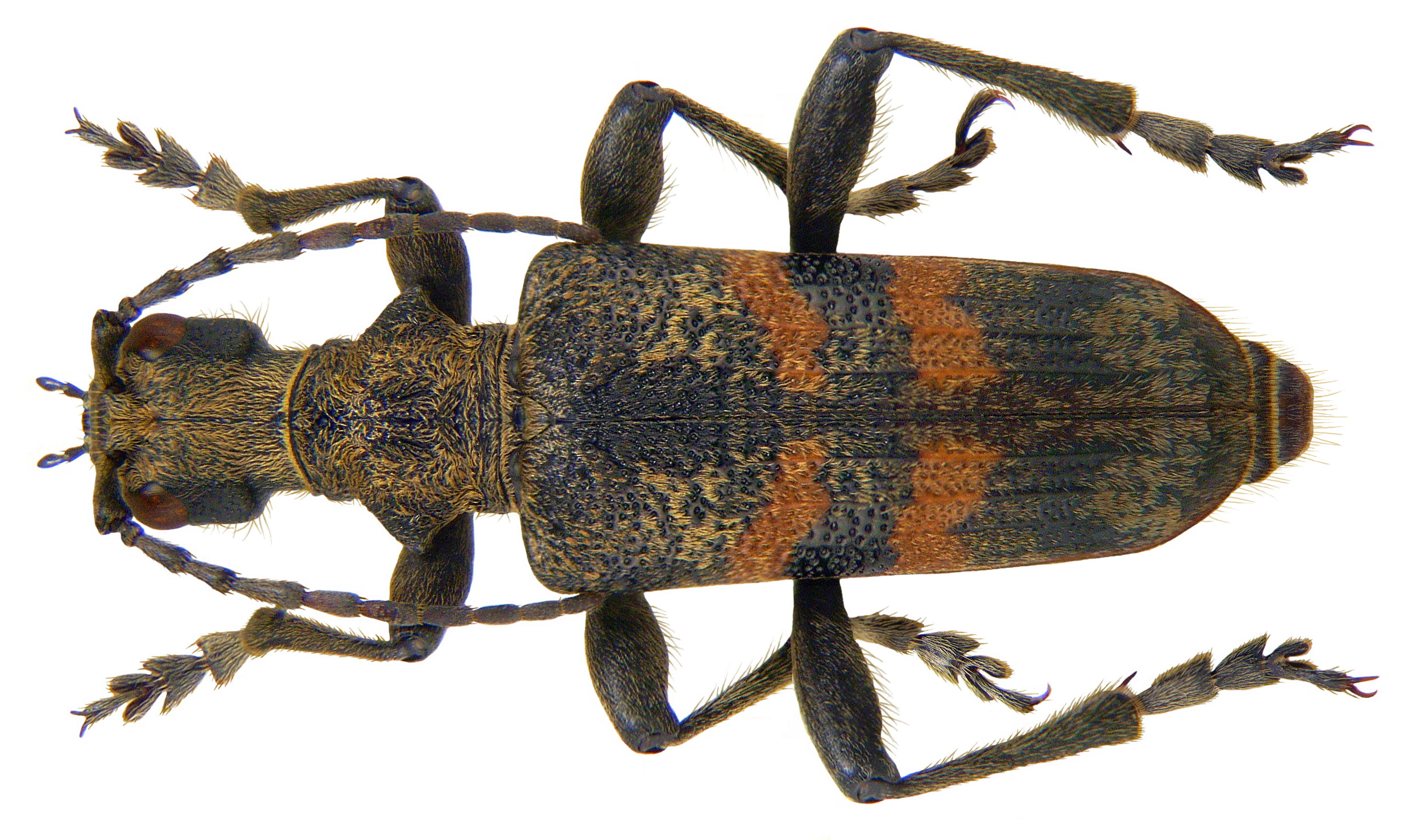

Scientific classification
- Domain: Eukaryota
- Kingdom: Animalia
- Phylum: Arthropoda
- Class: Insecta
- Order: Coleoptera
- Suborder: Polyphaga
- Infraorder: Cucujiformia
- Family: Cerambycidae
- Genus: Rhagium
- Species: R. mordax

Binomial name
- Rhagium mordax (DeGeer, 1775)

Synonyms
- Cerambyx mordax (DeGeer) Gmelin, 1790; Leptura mordax DeGeer, 1775; Rhagium linnei Laicharting, 1784; Rhagium vulgare Samouelle, 1819

= Rhagium mordax =

Species of beetle

Rhagium mordax, the black-spotted longhorn beetle, is a species of long-horned beetle. This beetle is found throughout Europe and to Kazakhstan and Russia. Larvae develop in silver fir, hazel, European weeping birch, European beech, and the European chestnut. Ischnoceros rusticus is an ichneumonid parasitoid wasp that feds on Rhagium mordax larvae.

== Description ==
Rhagium mordax grows from 13 to 26 millimetres (0.51 to 1.02 in) long. In colour, they are mixed ochre and black, with one black splotch on each elytron accompanied by two pale lines on either side. The beetles' bodies are covered with small yellow hairs, although one distinguishing feature of the species is two bald spots on its elytra.

Rhagium mordax has a long, narrow head with a distinct neck. The insect's face bears a suture and the temples are elongate with some stiff hairs. The antennae are relatively short and the first segment is wider at its tip and longer.

== Taxonomy ==
Rhagium mordax was first named Leptura mordax by Charles De Geer in 1775.

== Subtaxa ==
There are five formally described varieties:

- Rhagium mordax var. altajense Plavilstshikov, 1915
- Rhagium mordax var. klenkai Heyrovský, 1914
- Rhagium mordax var. mediofasciatum Plavilstshikov, 1936
- Rhagium mordax var. morvandicum Pic, 1927
- Rhagium mordax var. subdilatatum Pic, 1917
