= Rhagium femorale =

Scientific classification
- Kingdom: Animalia
- Phylum: Arthropoda
- Class: Insecta
- Order: Coleoptera
- Suborder: Polyphaga
- Infraorder: Cucujiformia
- Family: Cerambycidae
- Genus: Rhagium
- Species: R. femorale

Binomial name
- Rhagium femorale Ohbayashi, 1994

Species of beetle

Rhagium femorale is a species of beetle in the family Cerambycidae. It was described by Ohbayashi in 1994.
