= Rhagium phrygium =

Scientific classification
- Kingdom: Animalia
- Phylum: Arthropoda
- Class: Insecta
- Order: Coleoptera
- Suborder: Polyphaga
- Infraorder: Cucujiformia
- Family: Cerambycidae
- Genus: Rhagium
- Species: R. phrygium

Binomial name
- Rhagium phrygium Daniel, 1906

Species of beetle

Rhagium phrygium is a species of beetle in the family Cerambycidae. It was described by Daniel in 1906.
