= Rhagium iranum =

Scientific classification
- Kingdom: Animalia
- Phylum: Arthropoda
- Class: Insecta
- Order: Coleoptera
- Suborder: Polyphaga
- Infraorder: Cucujiformia
- Family: Cerambycidae
- Genus: Rhagium
- Species: R. iranum

Binomial name
- Rhagium iranum Heller, 1924

Species of beetle

Rhagium iranum is a species of beetle in the family Cerambycidae. It was described by Heller in 1924.
