= Rhagium morrisonense =

Scientific classification
- Kingdom: Animalia
- Phylum: Arthropoda
- Class: Insecta
- Order: Coleoptera
- Suborder: Polyphaga
- Infraorder: Cucujiformia
- Family: Cerambycidae
- Genus: Rhagium
- Species: R. morrisonense

Binomial name
- Rhagium morrisonense Kano, 1933

Species of beetle

Rhagium morrisonense is a species of beetle in the family Cerambycidae. It was described by Kano in 1933.
