= Rhagium japonicum =

Scientific classification
- Kingdom: Animalia
- Phylum: Arthropoda
- Class: Insecta
- Order: Coleoptera
- Suborder: Polyphaga
- Infraorder: Cucujiformia
- Family: Cerambycidae
- Genus: Rhagium
- Species: R. japonicum

Binomial name
- Rhagium japonicum Bates, 1884

Species of beetle

Rhagium japonicum is a species of beetle in the family Cerambycidae. It was described by Henry Walter Bates in 1884.
