= Rhagium pygmaeum =

Scientific classification
- Kingdom: Animalia
- Phylum: Arthropoda
- Class: Insecta
- Order: Coleoptera
- Suborder: Polyphaga
- Infraorder: Cucujiformia
- Family: Cerambycidae
- Genus: Rhagium
- Species: R. pygmaeum

Binomial name
- Rhagium pygmaeum Ganglbauer, 1881

Species of beetle

Rhagium pygmaeum is a species of beetle in the family Cerambycidae. It was described by Ludwig Ganglbauer in 1881.
