= Rhagium lineatum =

Scientific classification
- Kingdom: Animalia
- Phylum: Arthropoda
- Clade: Pancrustacea
- Class: Insecta
- Order: Coleoptera
- Suborder: Polyphaga
- Infraorder: Cucujiformia
- Family: Cerambycidae
- Genus: Rhagium
- Species: R. lineatum

Binomial name
- Rhagium lineatum (Olivier, 1795)

Species of beetle

Rhagium lineatum is a species of beetle in the family Cerambycidae. It was described by Guillaume-Antoine Olivier in 1795.
