= Rhagium syriacum =

Scientific classification
- Kingdom: Animalia
- Phylum: Arthropoda
- Class: Insecta
- Order: Coleoptera
- Suborder: Polyphaga
- Infraorder: Cucujiformia
- Family: Cerambycidae
- Genus: Rhagium
- Species: R. syriacum

Binomial name
- Rhagium syriacum Pic, 1892

Species of beetle

Rhagium syriacum is a species of beetle in the family Cerambycidae. It was described by Maurice Pic in 1892.
