= Climate of Iceland =

Köppen climate classification types of Iceland

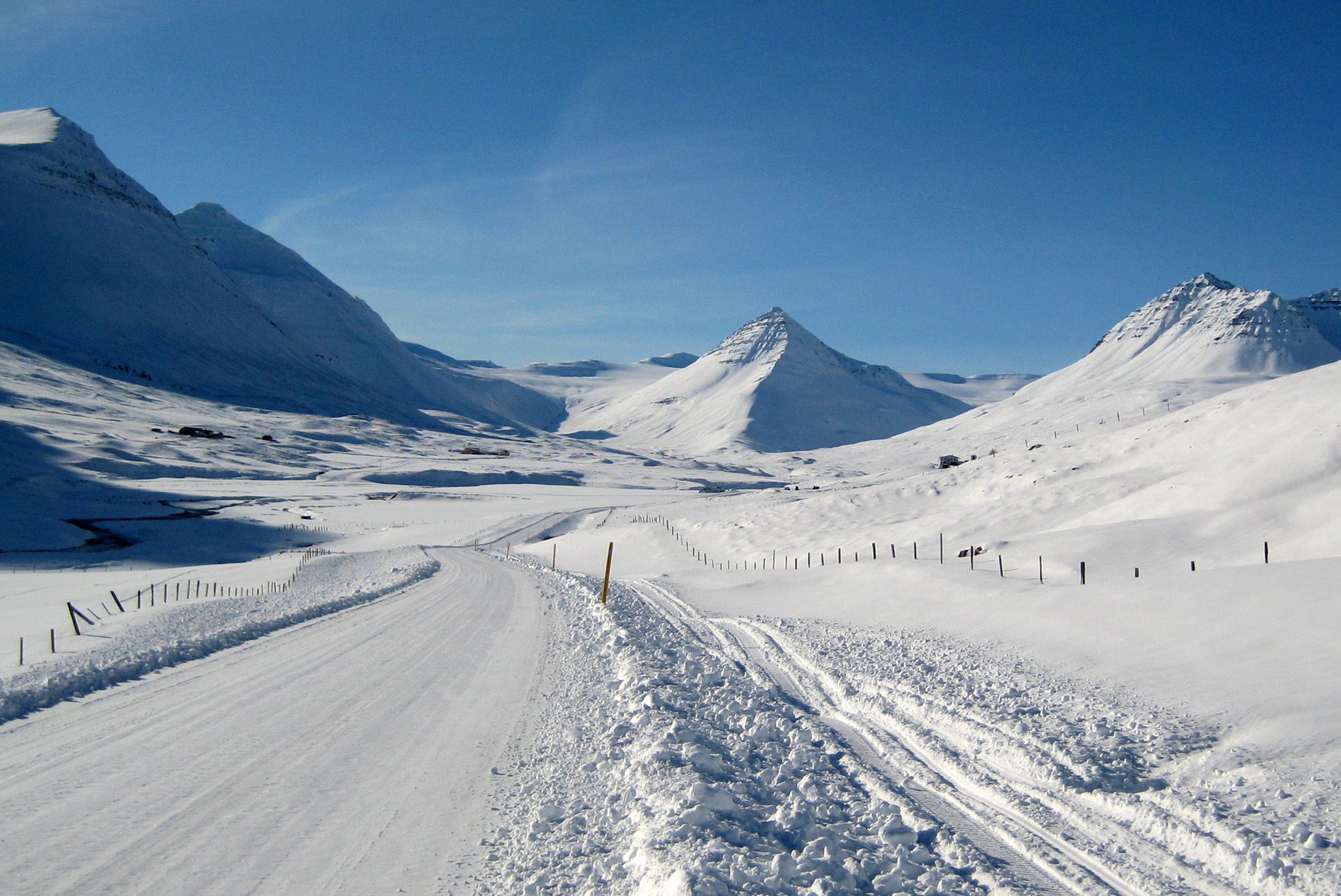
Winter landscape in Dalvíkurbyggð

Iceland has a subpolar oceanic climate (Köppen climate classification Cfc) near the southern coastal area and tundra (Köppen ET) inland in the highlands. The island lies in the path of the North Atlantic Current, which makes its climate more temperate than would be expected for its latitude just south of the Arctic Circle. This effect is aided by the Irminger Current, which also helps to moderate the island's temperature. The weather in Iceland is notoriously variable.

The aurora borealis is often visible at night during the winter. The midnight sun can be experienced in summer on the island of Grímsey off the north coast; the remainder of the country, since it lies just south of the polar circle, experiences a twilight period during which the sun sets briefly, but still has around two weeks of continuous daylight during the summer.

== Seasons ==
=== Winter ===
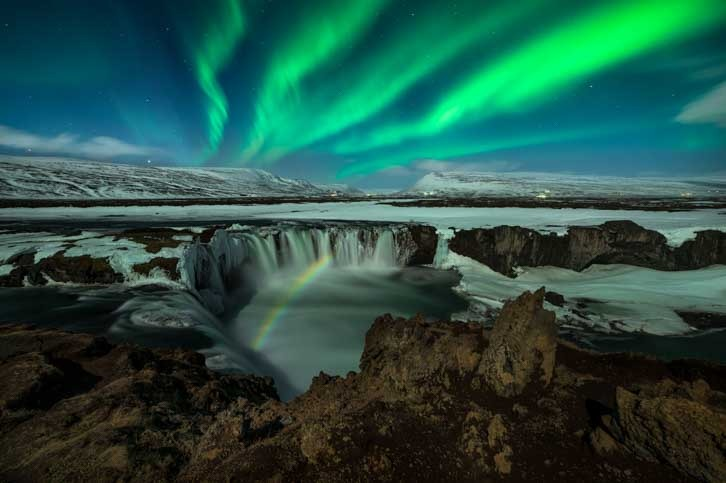
Aurora borealis over Goðafoss waterfall on Skjálfandafljót river

The Icelandic winter is relatively mild for its latitude, owing to maritime influence and proximity to the warm currents of the North Atlantic Gyre. The southerly lowlands of the island near the coast average around 1 °C (34 °F) in winter, while the northern lowland coast averages around −1 °C (30 °F). The lowest temperatures in the northern inland part of the island range from around −25 to −30 °C (−13 to −22 °F). The lowest temperature on record is −39.7 °C (−39.5 °F).

=== Summer ===
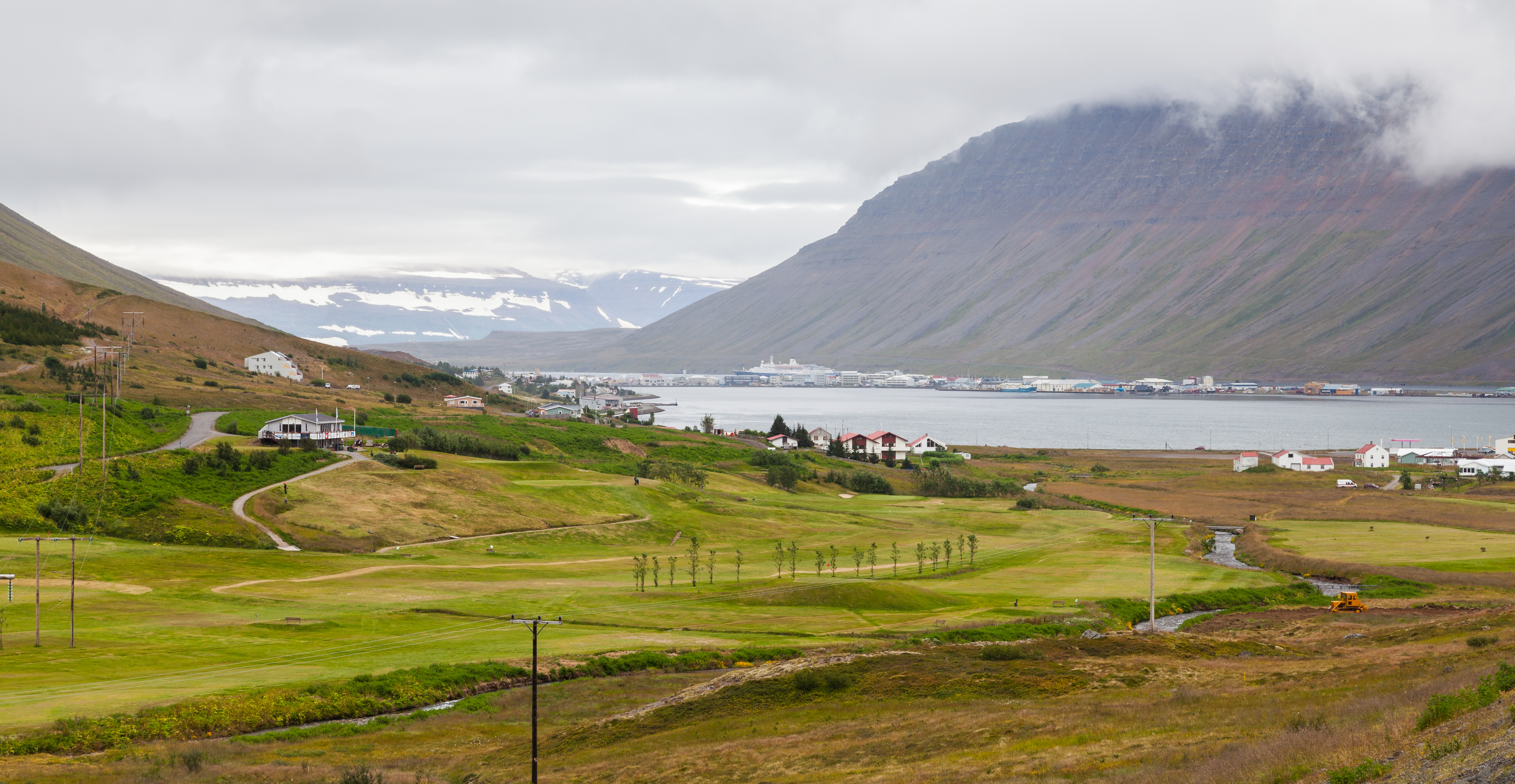
Summer landscape in Ísafjarðarbær, Westfjords

The average July temperature in the southern part of the island is 10–13 °C (50–55 °F). Warm summer days can reach 20–25 °C (68–77 °F). The highest temperature recorded was 30.5 °C (86.9 °F) in the Eastern fjords in 1939. Annual average sunshine hours in Reykjavík are around 1300, which is similar to towns in Scotland and Ireland.

== Winds and storms ==
Iceland, especially inland and during winter, is frequently subject to abrupt and dramatic changes in weather that can sharply reduce visibility, as well as rapidly increasing wind speed and precipitation, and shift temperature.

Generally, wind speeds tend to be higher in the highlands, but topographical features can aggravate winds and cause strong gusts in lowland areas. Wind speed in the lowlands reaches 18 m/s (65 km/h) on 10–20 days per year, but on upwards of 50 days per year in places in the highlands. The strongest measured 10-minute sustained wind speed is 62.5 m/s (225 km/h) and the strongest gust 74.2 m/s (267 km/h). Heavy dust storms can be generated by strong glacial winds, and can be very strong. Up to 10 tonnes (11 short tons) of material can be in motion per transect per hour. These storms are very frequent in the early summer in the arid highland areas north of the Vatnajökull glacier.

Thunderstorms are extremely rare for any specific location in Iceland, with fewer than five storms per year in the southern part of the island. They are most common in early or late summer. They can be caused by warm air masses coming up from Europe, or deep lows from the southwest in wintertime. Lightning can usually be observed in connection with ash plumes erupting from the island's volcanoes. Vortices, sometimes on the scale of tornadoes, also occur with volcanic eruptions. Landspouts and waterspouts are occasionally observed. Classic mesocyclone derived tornadoes (i.e. forming from supercells) are very rare, but have been observed. Any of these do occasionally cause damage, although the sparse population further reduces the probability of detection and the hazard.

== Atmospheric pressure ==
There is a persistent area of low pressure near Iceland known as the Icelandic Low, found between Iceland and Greenland. This area affects the amount of air brought into the Arctic to the east, and the amount coming out of the Arctic to the west. It is part of a greater pressure system known as the North Atlantic Oscillation (NAO).

== Climatic data ==
Climate data for Reykjavík, 1991–2020 normals, extremes 1829–present
Month	Jan	Feb	Mar	Apr	May	Jun	Jul	Aug	Sep	Oct	Nov	Dec	Year
Record high °C (°F)	17.0 (62.6)	16.2 (61.2)	18.1 (64.6)	18.5 (65.3)	20.6 (69.1)	22.4 (72.3)	25.7 (78.3)	24.8 (76.6)	20.1 (68.2)	16.8 (62.2)	14.6 (58.3)	12.9 (55.2)	25.7 (78.3)
Mean daily maximum °C (°F)	3.2 (37.8)	3.3 (37.9)	4.2 (39.6)	6.9 (44.4)	10.1 (50.2)	13.0 (55.4)	14.9 (58.8)	14.1 (57.4)	11.4 (52.5)	7.6 (45.7)	4.7 (40.5)	3.3 (37.9)	8.1 (46.6)
Daily mean °C (°F)	0.7 (33.3)	0.5 (32.9)	1.2 (34.2)	3.7 (38.7)	6.7 (44.1)	9.8 (49.6)	11.6 (52.9)	11.0 (51.8)	8.5 (47.3)	4.9 (40.8)	2.2 (36.0)	0.8 (33.4)	5.1 (41.2)
Mean daily minimum °C (°F)	−1.7 (28.9)	−1.9 (28.6)	−1.3 (29.7)	1.0 (33.8)	4.0 (39.2)	7.2 (45.0)	9.1 (48.4)	8.6 (47.5)	6.2 (43.2)	2.7 (36.9)	−0.1 (31.8)	−1.6 (29.1)	2.7 (36.9)
Record low °C (°F)	−24.5 (−12.1)	−17.6 (0.3)	−16.4 (2.5)	−16.4 (2.5)	−7.7 (18.1)	−0.7 (30.7)	1.4 (34.5)	−0.4 (31.3)	−4.4 (24.1)	−10.6 (12.9)	−15.1 (4.8)	−16.8 (1.8)	−24.5 (−12.1)
Average precipitation mm (inches)	87.1 (3.43)	90.6 (3.57)	80.7 (3.18)	59.0 (2.32)	52.6 (2.07)	43.3 (1.70)	49.9 (1.96)	64.5 (2.54)	87.0 (3.43)	79.8 (3.14)	86.5 (3.41)	94.9 (3.74)	875.9 (34.48)
Average snowfall cm (inches)	19.9 (7.8)	17.1 (6.7)	23.2 (9.1)	12.1 (4.8)	1.6 (0.6)	0.0 (0.0)	0.0 (0.0)	0.0 (0.0)	0.0 (0.0)	1.4 (0.6)	8.7 (3.4)	17.8 (7.0)	101.8 (40.1)
Average precipitation days (≥ 1.0 mm)	15.3	15.0	14.2	12.0	10.8	9.3	10.3	11.6	15.0	13.1	13.7	14.6	154.9
Average snowy days (≥ 0 cm)	12.2	12.4	9.6	2.1	0.3	0.0	0.0	0.0	0.0	0.6	5.3	12.6	55.1
Average relative humidity (%)	78.1	77.1	76.2	74.4	74.9	77.9	80.3	81.6	79.0	78.0	77.7	77.7	77.8
Average dew point °C (°F)	−2.9 (26.8)	−3.3 (26.1)	−3.0 (26.6)	−1.0 (30.2)	2.0 (35.6)	5.6 (42.1)	7.9 (46.2)	7.6 (45.7)	5.1 (41.2)	1.2 (34.2)	−1.5 (29.3)	−2.9 (26.8)	1.2 (34.2)
Mean monthly sunshine hours	22.6	61.6	110.3	165.1	209.0	189.5	183.1	164.8	118.3	91.6	39.7	12.6	1,368.2
Percentage possible sunshine	12	25	29	36	35	28	28	31	31	31	21	16	27
Average ultraviolet index	0	0	1	2	3	4	4	3	2	1	0	0	2
Source 1: Icelandic Met Office, NOAA
Source 2: timeanddate.com (sunshine percent and dewpoints), Weather Atlas, (UV) and Meteo Climat

Climate data for Akureyri, 1991–2020 normals, extremes 1949–present
Month	Jan	Feb	Mar	Apr	May	Jun	Jul	Aug	Sep	Oct	Nov	Dec	Year
Record high °C (°F)	17.5 (63.5)	14.5 (58.1)	15.2 (59.4)	21.5 (70.7)	24.6 (76.3)	29.4 (84.9)	27.6 (81.7)	27.7 (81.9)	23.6 (74.5)	19.5 (67.1)	20.4 (68.7)	15.1 (59.2)	29.4 (84.9)
Mean daily maximum °C (°F)	2.7 (36.9)	2.6 (36.7)	3.5 (38.3)	6.6 (43.9)	10.3 (50.5)	13.7 (56.7)	15.1 (59.2)	14.8 (58.6)	11.8 (53.2)	6.6 (43.9)	3.6 (38.5)	2.6 (36.7)	7.8 (46.0)
Daily mean °C (°F)	−0.5 (31.1)	−0.8 (30.6)	-0.0 (32.0)	2.6 (36.7)	6.2 (43.2)	9.6 (49.3)	11.2 (52.2)	10.8 (51.4)	8.0 (46.4)	3.5 (38.3)	0.6 (33.1)	−0.7 (30.7)	4.2 (39.6)
Mean daily minimum °C (°F)	−3.5 (25.7)	−3.6 (25.5)	−2.6 (27.3)	−0.3 (31.5)	3.2 (37.8)	6.6 (43.9)	8.5 (47.3)	7.9 (46.2)	5.4 (41.7)	1.1 (34.0)	−2.1 (28.2)	−3.6 (25.5)	1.4 (34.5)
Record low °C (°F)	−21.6 (−6.9)	−21.2 (−6.2)	−23.0 (−9.4)	−18.2 (−0.8)	−10.4 (13.3)	−2.1 (28.2)	1.3 (34.3)	−2.2 (28.0)	−8.4 (16.9)	−13.6 (7.5)	−18.5 (−1.3)	−20.6 (−5.1)	−23.0 (−9.4)
Average precipitation mm (inches)	60.2 (2.37)	52.2 (2.06)	47.4 (1.87)	25.9 (1.02)	24.1 (0.95)	20.7 (0.81)	33.7 (1.33)	41.4 (1.63)	53.2 (2.09)	74.0 (2.91)	68.3 (2.69)	72.8 (2.87)	573.9 (22.59)
Average precipitation days (≥ 1.0 mm)	11.1	10.2	9.9	6.7	5.9	4.9	7.7	8.1	9.4	11.7	10.9	12.0	108.5
Average snowy days (≥ 0 cm)	22.0	16.9	16.1	5.7	0.3	0.0	0.0	0.0	0.1	3.9	12.4	18.1	95.5
Average relative humidity (%)	79.4	79.3	78.9	75.7	73.4	73.2	77.8	78.3	77.4	81.2	80.8	79.5	77.9
Average dew point °C (°F)	−3.8 (25.2)	−4.2 (24.4)	−3.7 (25.3)	−1.9 (28.6)	1.1 (34.0)	4.7 (40.5)	7.2 (45.0)	6.9 (44.4)	4.0 (39.2)	0.2 (32.4)	−2.5 (27.5)	−3.9 (25.0)	0.3 (32.6)
Mean monthly sunshine hours	6.5	33.9	77.9	127.5	171.0	189.9	152.5	138.0	90.4	47.9	15.2	0.3	1,051
Source 1: Icelandic Met Office (humidity 1981–2010)
Source 2: NOAA

Climate data for Vestmannaeyjar, 1981–2010 normals, extremes 1949–2013
Month	Jan	Feb	Mar	Apr	May	Jun	Jul	Aug	Sep	Oct	Nov	Dec	Year
Record high °C (°F)	9.2 (48.6)	10.0 (50.0)	9.0 (48.2)	11.6 (52.9)	16.5 (61.7)	19.3 (66.7)	21.6 (70.9)	20.3 (68.5)	15.4 (59.7)	13.4 (56.1)	10.5 (50.9)	10.0 (50.0)	21.6 (70.9)
Mean daily maximum °C (°F)	3.8 (38.8)	3.8 (38.8)	3.9 (39.0)	5.6 (42.1)	8.4 (47.1)	10.5 (50.9)	12.3 (54.1)	12.1 (53.8)	9.8 (49.6)	6.8 (44.2)	5.0 (41.0)	4.1 (39.4)	7.2 (45.0)
Daily mean °C (°F)	1.8 (35.2)	1.7 (35.1)	1.8 (35.2)	3.5 (38.3)	6.1 (43.0)	8.4 (47.1)	10.1 (50.2)	10.2 (50.4)	8.0 (46.4)	5.1 (41.2)	3.2 (37.8)	2.1 (35.8)	5.2 (41.4)
Mean daily minimum °C (°F)	−0.3 (31.5)	−0.4 (31.3)	−0.2 (31.6)	1.7 (35.1)	4.4 (39.9)	6.9 (44.4)	8.6 (47.5)	8.7 (47.7)	6.5 (43.7)	3.5 (38.3)	1.3 (34.3)	0.2 (32.4)	3.4 (38.1)
Record low °C (°F)	−15.7 (3.7)	−16.3 (2.7)	−14.9 (5.2)	−16.9 (1.6)	−7.1 (19.2)	−1.4 (29.5)	3.7 (38.7)	2.6 (36.7)	−2.6 (27.3)	−7.5 (18.5)	−10.7 (12.7)	−15.3 (4.5)	−16.9 (1.6)
Average precipitation mm (inches)	159.4 (6.28)	141.9 (5.59)	137.1 (5.40)	112.6 (4.43)	94.1 (3.70)	83.6 (3.29)	103.4 (4.07)	137.9 (5.43)	153.6 (6.05)	154.8 (6.09)	153.7 (6.05)	165.7 (6.52)	1,597.9 (62.91)
Average precipitation days (≥ 1.0 mm)	19.3	18.1	17.6	15.3	13.5	11.5	13.4	15.3	17.1	16.7	16.5	18.5	192.0
Average snowy days (≥ 0 cm)	8.7	7.4	6.5	1.9	0.4	0.0	0.0	0.0	0.0	0.6	2.9	6.2	33.9
Average relative humidity (%)	78.8	79.6	78.5	80.1	82.4	87.2	88.3	87.4	84.4	82.8	79.8	78.7	82.3
Average dew point °C (°F)	−1.5 (29.3)	−1.7 (28.9)	−1.8 (28.8)	0.0 (32.0)	3.1 (37.6)	6.2 (43.2)	8.2 (46.8)	8.1 (46.6)	5.4 (41.7)	2.0 (35.6)	0.0 (32.0)	−1.3 (29.7)	2.2 (36.0)
Source 1: NOAA (humidity 1961-1990)
Source 2: Iceland Met Office (extremes)

Coastal temperature data for Vestmannaeyjar
Month	Jan	Feb	Mar	Apr	May	Jun	Jul	Aug	Sep	Oct	Nov	Dec	Year
Average sea temperature °C (°F)	6.3 (43.34)	6.5 (43.70)	6.3 (43.34)	6.7 (44.06)	8.0 (46.40)	9.3 (48.74)	11.1 (51.98)	11.6 (52.88)	11.0 (51.80)	8.7 (47.66)	7.6 (45.68)	6.9 (44.42)	8.3 (47.00)
Source 1: Seatemperature.net

Climate data for Bergstaðir, 4 km (2.5 mi) from Sauðárkrókur, 1981–2010 normals, extremes 1978–2018
Month	Jan	Feb	Mar	Apr	May	Jun	Jul	Aug	Sep	Oct	Nov	Dec	Year
Record high °C (°F)	11.0 (51.8)	11.3 (52.3)	12.6 (54.7)	19.6 (67.3)	20.5 (68.9)	22.7 (72.9)	24.5 (76.1)	26.5 (79.7)	20.5 (68.9)	17.2 (63.0)	15.5 (59.9)	13.4 (56.1)	26.5 (79.7)
Mean daily maximum °C (°F)	1.2 (34.2)	1.3 (34.3)	1.9 (35.4)	4.7 (40.5)	8.8 (47.8)	12.3 (54.1)	13.8 (56.8)	13.3 (55.9)	10.0 (50.0)	5.4 (41.7)	2.8 (37.0)	1.7 (35.1)	6.4 (43.5)
Daily mean °C (°F)	−1.6 (29.1)	−1.9 (28.6)	−1.1 (30.0)	1.4 (34.5)	5.1 (41.2)	8.6 (47.5)	10.1 (50.2)	9.8 (49.6)	6.6 (43.9)	2.6 (36.7)	0.0 (32.0)	−1.1 (30.0)	3.2 (37.8)
Mean daily minimum °C (°F)	−4.6 (23.7)	−4.7 (23.5)	−3.8 (25.2)	−1.3 (29.7)	2.2 (36.0)	5.6 (42.1)	7.5 (45.5)	7.2 (45.0)	4.1 (39.4)	0.2 (32.4)	−2.7 (27.1)	−4.1 (24.6)	0.5 (32.9)
Record low °C (°F)	−19.2 (−2.6)	−19.9 (−3.8)	−22.1 (−7.8)	−14.6 (5.7)	−12.7 (9.1)	−3.2 (26.2)	1.6 (34.9)	−0.2 (31.6)	−6.1 (21.0)	−11.3 (11.7)	−17.2 (1.0)	−19.1 (−2.4)	−22.1 (−7.8)
Average precipitation mm (inches)	42.2 (1.66)	37.6 (1.48)	40.8 (1.61)	28.7 (1.13)	25.3 (1.00)	27.7 (1.09)	35.9 (1.41)	42.5 (1.67)	48.3 (1.90)	50.6 (1.99)	37.7 (1.48)	43.9 (1.73)	461.3 (18.16)
Average precipitation days (≥ 1.0 mm)	7.8	9.0	9.0	7.3	6.2	6.2	8.2	8.9	9.8	10.8	8.7	9.0	100.0
Average snowy days (≥ 0 cm)	19.2	17.1	16.7	8.1	1.3	0.0	0.0	0.0	0.4	5.3	13.2	17.3	98.6
Source 1: NOAA
Source 2: Icelandic Met Office (extremes)

Climate data for Reykir í Ölfusi (1981–2000)
Month	Jan	Feb	Mar	Apr	May	Jun	Jul	Aug	Sep	Oct	Nov	Dec	Year
Record high °C (°F)	8.2 (46.8)	9.0 (48.2)	8.6 (47.5)	15.1 (59.2)	19.2 (66.6)	24.0 (75.2)	23.3 (73.9)	21.0 (69.8)	18.5 (65.3)	13.0 (55.4)	10.9 (51.6)	10.5 (50.9)	24.0 (75.2)
Mean daily maximum °C (°F)	2.2 (36.0)	2.2 (36.0)	2.2 (36.0)	5.0 (41.0)	9.3 (48.7)	12.2 (54.0)	14.0 (57.2)	13.2 (55.8)	10.3 (50.5)	6.3 (43.3)	3.8 (38.8)	2.4 (36.3)	6.9 (44.5)
Daily mean °C (°F)	−0.2 (31.6)	−0.1 (31.8)	-0.0 (32.0)	2.2 (36.0)	6.2 (43.2)	9.0 (48.2)	10.8 (51.4)	10.3 (50.5)	7.6 (45.7)	4.3 (39.7)	1.8 (35.2)	0.1 (32.2)	4.3 (39.8)
Mean daily minimum °C (°F)	−2.7 (27.1)	−2.6 (27.3)	−2.6 (27.3)	−0.1 (31.8)	3.8 (38.8)	6.7 (44.1)	8.6 (47.5)	8.3 (46.9)	5.4 (41.7)	2.1 (35.8)	−0.3 (31.5)	−2.1 (28.2)	2.0 (35.7)
Record low °C (°F)	−14.4 (6.1)	−12.7 (9.1)	−14.9 (5.2)	−10.1 (13.8)	−7.3 (18.9)	−1.3 (29.7)	2.1 (35.8)	0.9 (33.6)	−3.1 (26.4)	−7.1 (19.2)	−11.2 (11.8)	−13.7 (7.3)	−14.9 (5.2)
Average precipitation mm (inches)	138.5 (5.45)	139.6 (5.50)	145.6 (5.73)	110.0 (4.33)	127.0 (5.00)	112.7 (4.44)	141.5 (5.57)	159.1 (6.26)	137.8 (5.43)	149.3 (5.88)	133.1 (5.24)	146.2 (5.76)	1,640.4 (64.59)
Mean monthly sunshine hours	18.2	46.4	100.8	147.5	159.0	150.8	142.3	125.2	112.2	81.3	40.3	14.1	1,138.1
Source: Icelandic Met Office

== Climate change ==
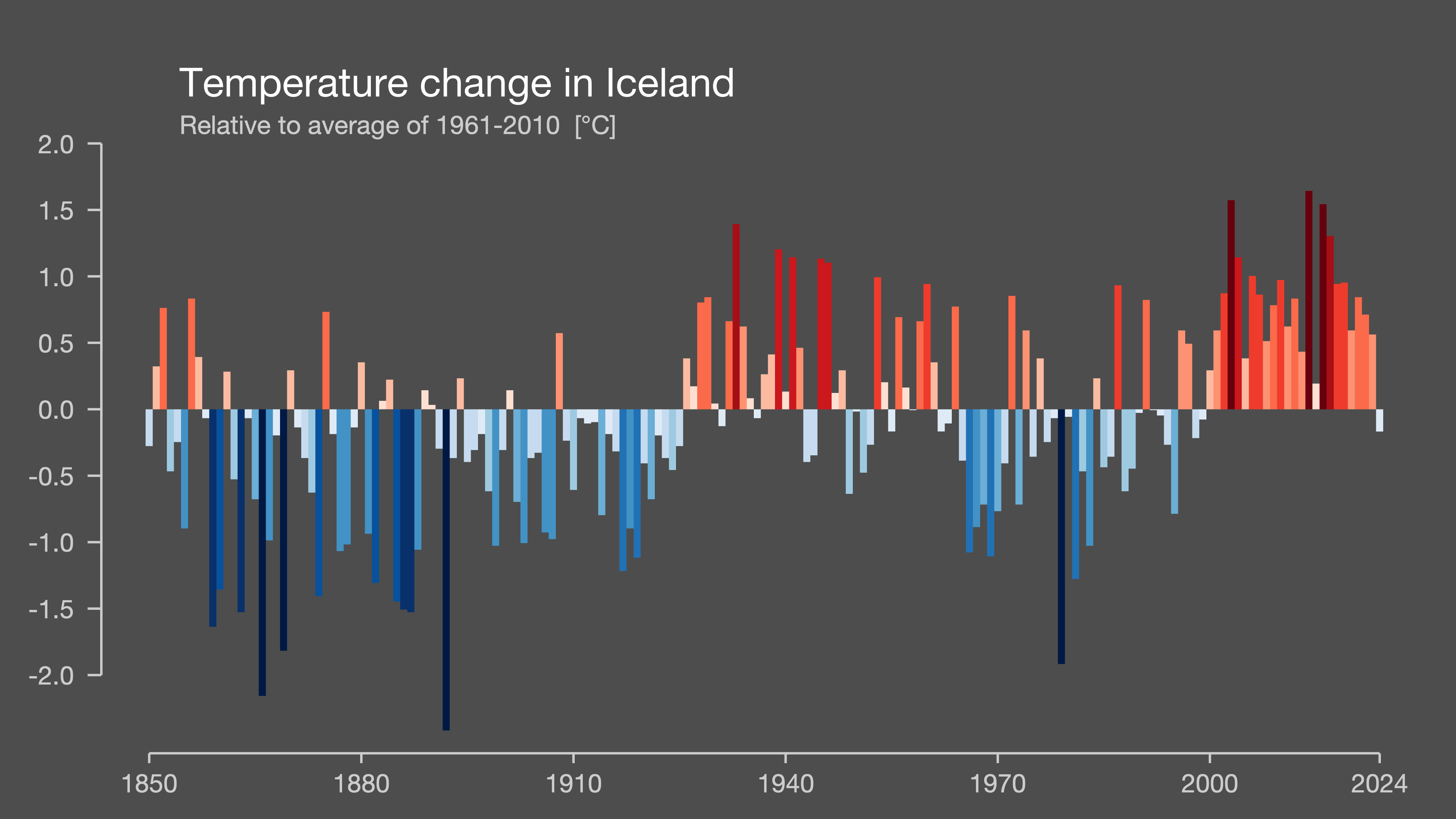
Temperature change in Iceland, each bar represents the average temperature over that year.

Due to climate change, Iceland is experiencing faster glacial retreat, changing vegetation patterns and shifting marine ecosystems. Although Iceland ranks relatively low internationally in absolute greenhouse gas emissions, it ranks within the top 25 countries for emissions per person. Iceland’s main energy sources are geothermal and hydropower, with fossil fuels mostly utilized in the transport sector. Iceland has committed to reaching carbon neutrality before 2040.

750 square kilometers of Iceland’s glacier ice has melted since the year 2000. Iceland’s annual CO_{2} emissions and per capita CO_{2} emissions rose from 1950 to 2018, but both metrics have been on the decline since 2018. A majority of Iceland’s CO_{2} emissions come from oil.

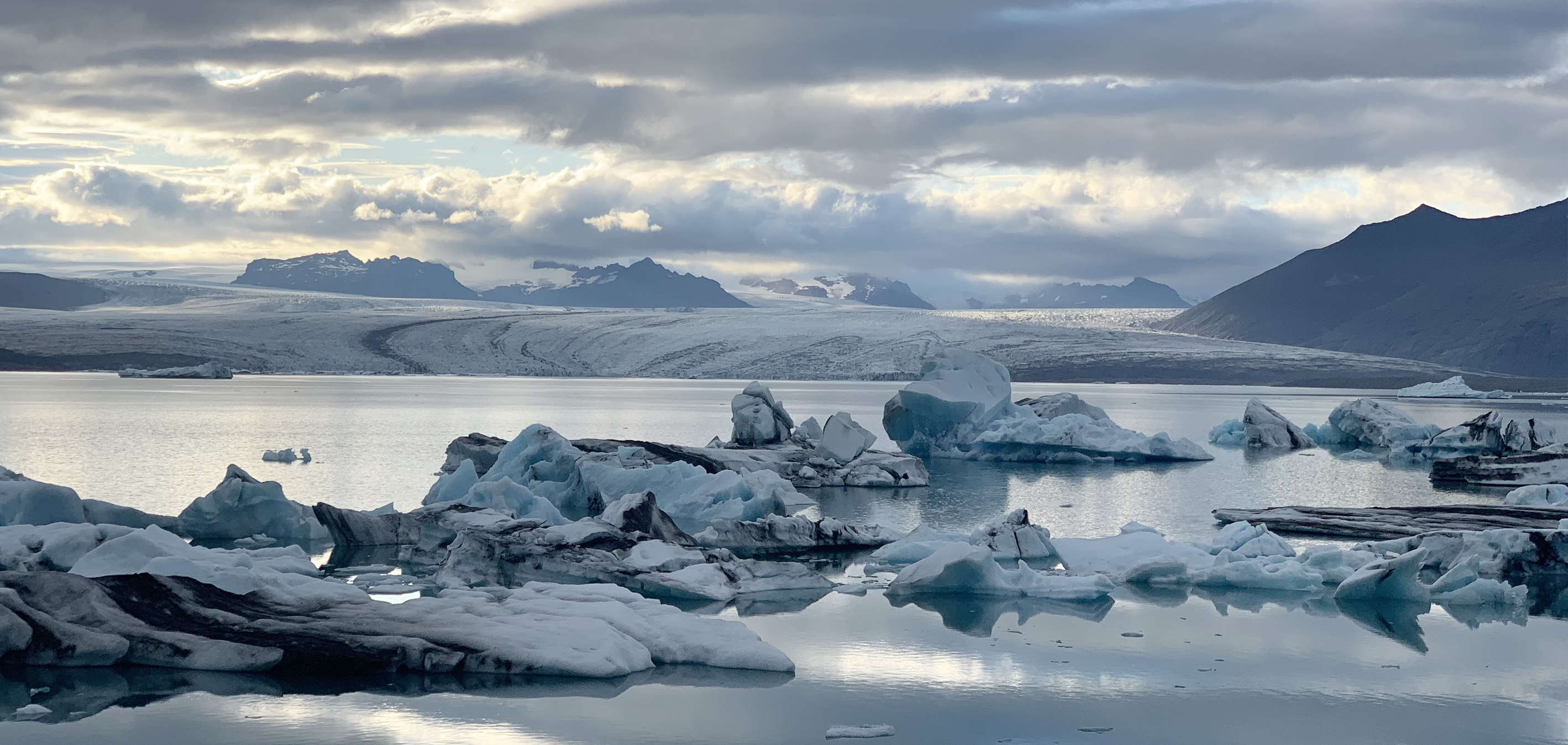
Ice lagoon at the foot of the Vatnajökull glacier

Most Icelandic glaciers began retreating in the late 1800s, but current modeling studies suggest that glaciers would lose a quarter of their volume in the next hundred years with just a 1°C rise in global temperatures. The models also predict that glaciers could lose sixty percent of their volume if global temperatures rise by 2°C. At this rate, only small ice caps will remain after two hundred years. Some models predict Iceland's glacial mass will shrink a third by 2100.

Iceland’s retreating glaciers have global and local consequences. Melting of Iceland’s glaciers could raise sea levels by a centimeter, which could lead to erosion and flooding worldwide. Locally, glacial recession could cause crustal uplift, which could disrupt buildings. Some places in Iceland have already seen the crust rise at a rate of 40 millimeters per year.

In late 2025, Iceland classified the potential collapse of the Atlantic meridional overturning circulation (AMOC) as a national security and existential risk.

=== Okjökull ===
Okjökull was a glacier in Iceland that melted in 2014. Okjökull was Iceland's first glacier to have melted due to climate change.

==== Name change ====
Geologists estimate that Okjökull covered about 6 square miles in the late 1800s, but slowly shrank until it officially lost its glacier status in 2014. When it "died", the 800 year old glacier's name was changed from Okjökull to Ok. Okjökull was pronounced dead in part due to its decrease in area, but also due to its inability to flow; a body of ice must be able to move to be defined as a glacier. “Jökull” means glacier in Icelandic, so this suffix was removed accordingly.

==== "Funeral" ====
In 2018, a documentary called Not Ok was released by Rice University anthropologists four years after its death. In 2019, roughly one hundred people held a funeral for Okjökull. Iceland’s prime minister at the time, Katrín Jakobsdóttir, was among the attendees.

At the funeral, one high school student read a poem and a commemorative plaque, titled "A letter to the future," was placed on a boulder. As of 2022, this plaque was the only one commemorating a glacier lost to climate change. The plaque warned future readers that all of Iceland's glaciers would soon "follow the same path" as Okjökull.

=== Sustainability ===
In an effort to combat the effects climate change has on Iceland’s glaciers, Iceland has worked to make its electricity completely sustainable. As of 2015, nearly all of its electricity comes from renewable energy. Thirteen percent of the country’s electricity comes from geothermal energy—which also heats ninety percent of Iceland’s homes—and the rest comes from hydropower.

== See also ==
- Climate of the Nordic countries
- Geography of Iceland
