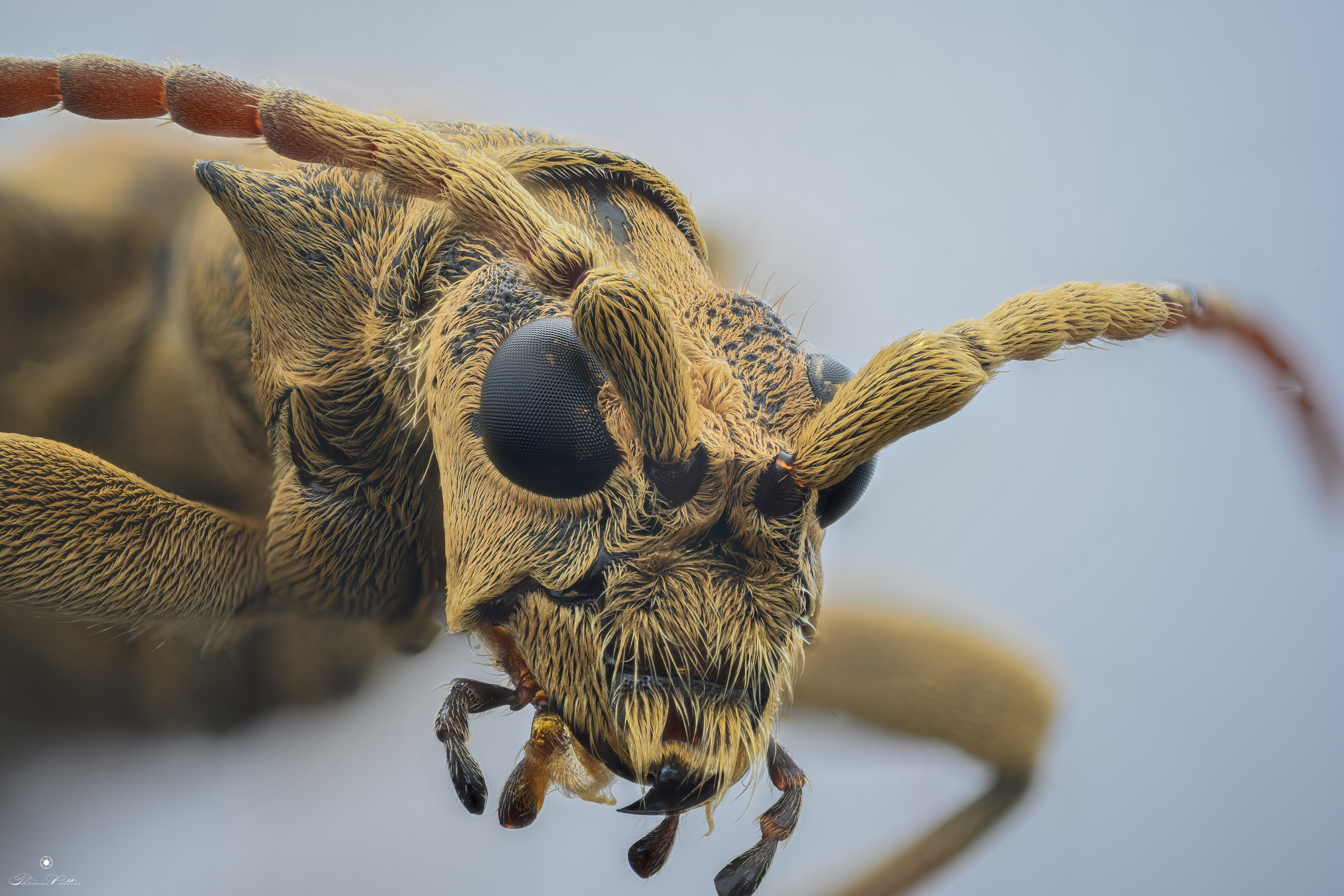

Scientific classification
- Kingdom: Animalia
- Phylum: Arthropoda
- Clade: Pancrustacea
- Class: Insecta
- Order: Coleoptera
- Suborder: Polyphaga
- Infraorder: Cucujiformia
- Family: Cerambycidae
- Genus: Rhagium
- Species: R. sycophanta

Binomial name
- Rhagium sycophanta (Schrank, 1781)

= Rhagium sycophanta =

Species of beetle

Rhagium sycophanta is a species of beetle in the family Cerambycidae. It was described by Schrank in 1781.
