= Rhagium caucasicum =

Scientific classification
- Kingdom: Animalia
- Phylum: Arthropoda
- Class: Insecta
- Order: Coleoptera
- Suborder: Polyphaga
- Infraorder: Cucujiformia
- Family: Cerambycidae
- Genus: Rhagium
- Species: R. caucasicum

Binomial name
- Rhagium caucasicum Reitter, 1889

Species of beetle

Rhagium caucasicum is a species of beetle in the family Cerambycidae. It was described by Reitter in 1889.
