= Rhagium quinghaiensis =

Scientific classification
- Kingdom: Animalia
- Phylum: Arthropoda
- Class: Insecta
- Order: Coleoptera
- Suborder: Polyphaga
- Infraorder: Cucujiformia
- Family: Cerambycidae
- Genus: Rhagium
- Species: R. quinghaiensis

Binomial name
- Rhagium quinghaiensis Chen & Chiang, 2000

Species of beetle

Rhagium quinghaiensis is a species of beetle in the family Cerambycidae. It was described by Chen and Chiang in 2000.
