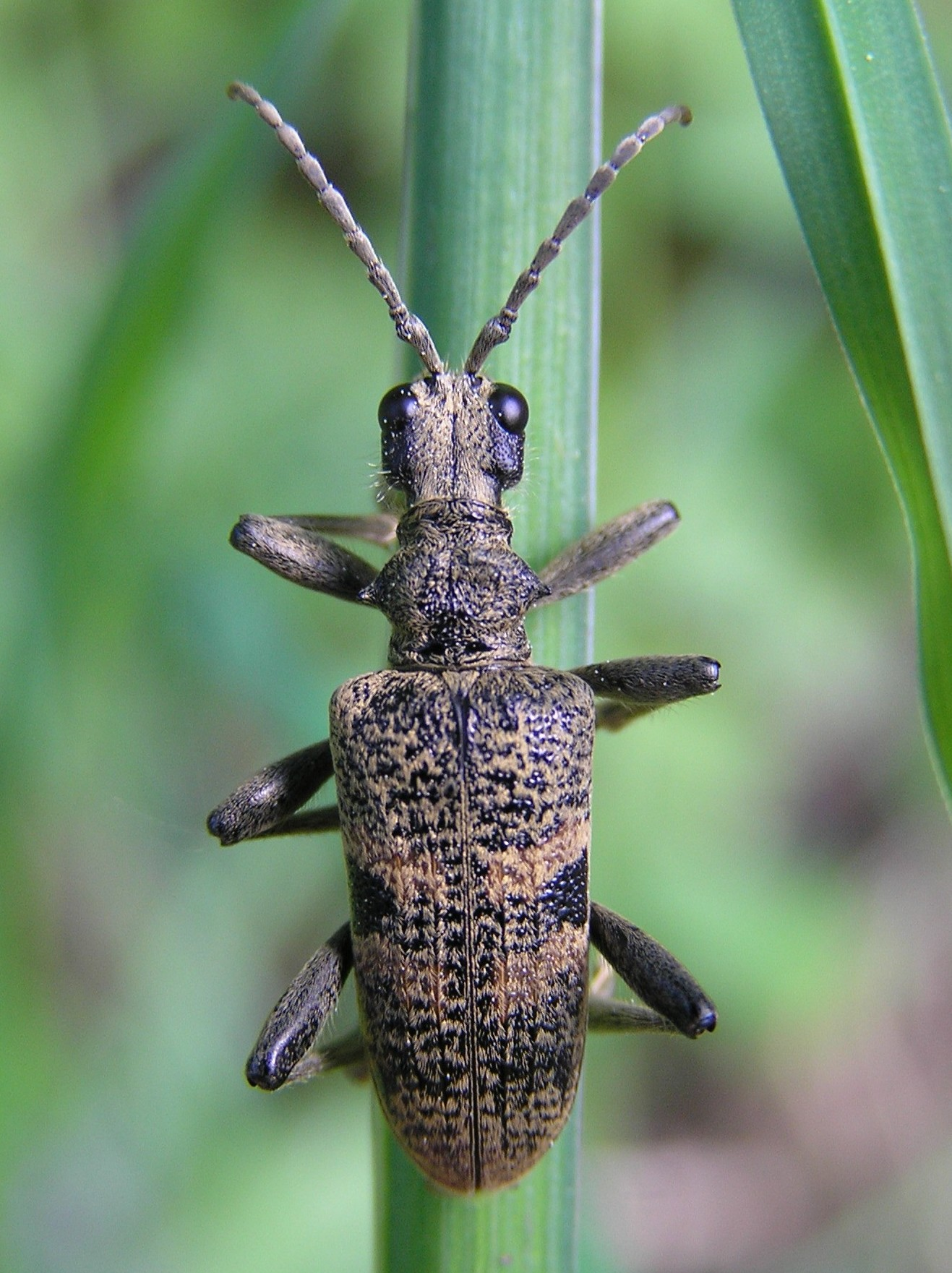
- Rhagium mordax

Scientific classification
- Domain: Eukaryota
- Kingdom: Animalia
- Phylum: Arthropoda
- Class: Insecta
- Order: Coleoptera
- Suborder: Polyphaga
- Infraorder: Cucujiformia
- Family: Cerambycidae
- Subfamily: Lepturinae
- Tribe: Rhagiini
- Genus: Rhagium; Fabricius, 1775

= Rhagium =

Genus of beetles

Rhagium is a genus of flower longhorn beetles in the family Cerambycidae.

== Classification ==
- Subgenus: Hagrium Villiers, 1978
  - Species: Rhagium bifasciatum Fabricius, 1775
- Subgenus: Megarhagium Reitter, 1913
  - Species: Rhagium caucasicum Reitter, 1889
  - Species: Rhagium elmaliense Schmid, 1999
  - Species: Rhagium fasciculatum Faldermann, 1837
  - Species: Rhagium iranum Heller, 1924
  - Species: Rhagium mordax (DeGeer, 1775)
  - Species: Rhagium phrygium Daniel, 1906
  - Species: Rhagium pygmaeum Ganglbauer, 1881
  - Species: Rhagium sycophanta (Schrank, 1781)
  - Species: Rhagium syriacum Pic, 1892
- Subgenus: Rhagium Fabricius, 1775
  - Species: Rhagium americanum Podany, 1964
  - Species: Rhagium canadense Podany, 1964
  - Species: Rhagium cariniventre Casey, 1913
  - Species: Rhagium femorale Ohbayashi, 1994
  - Species: Rhagium heyrovskyi Podaný, 1964
  - Species: Rhagium inquisitor (Linnaeus, 1758)
  - Species: Rhagium japonicum Bates, 1884
  - Species: Rhagium lineatum (Olivier, 1795)
  - Species: Rhagium mexicanum Casey, 1913
  - Species: Rhagium montanum Casey, 1913
  - Species: Rhagium morrisonense Kano, 1933
  - Species: Rhagium pseudojaponicum Podaný, 1964
  - Species: Rhagium quadricostatus Podany, 1964
  - Species: Rhagium quinghaiensis Chen & Chiang, 2000

== Gallery ==
Rhagium inquisitor

Rhagium sycophanta on moss in a forest
