= Rhagium elmaliense =

Scientific classification
- Kingdom: Animalia
- Phylum: Arthropoda
- Class: Insecta
- Order: Coleoptera
- Suborder: Polyphaga
- Infraorder: Cucujiformia
- Family: Cerambycidae
- Genus: Rhagium
- Species: R. elmaliense

Binomial name
- Rhagium elmaliense Schmid, 1999

Species of beetle

Rhagium elmaliense is a species of beetle in the family Cerambycidae. It was described by Schmid in 1999.
