= Rhagium quadricostatus =

Scientific classification
- Kingdom: Animalia
- Phylum: Arthropoda
- Class: Insecta
- Order: Coleoptera
- Suborder: Polyphaga
- Infraorder: Cucujiformia
- Family: Cerambycidae
- Genus: Rhagium
- Species: R. quadricostatus

Binomial name
- Rhagium quadricostatus Podany, 1964

Species of beetle

Rhagium quadricostatus is a species of beetle in the family Cerambycidae. It was described by Podany in 1964.
