= Climate of the Nordic countries =

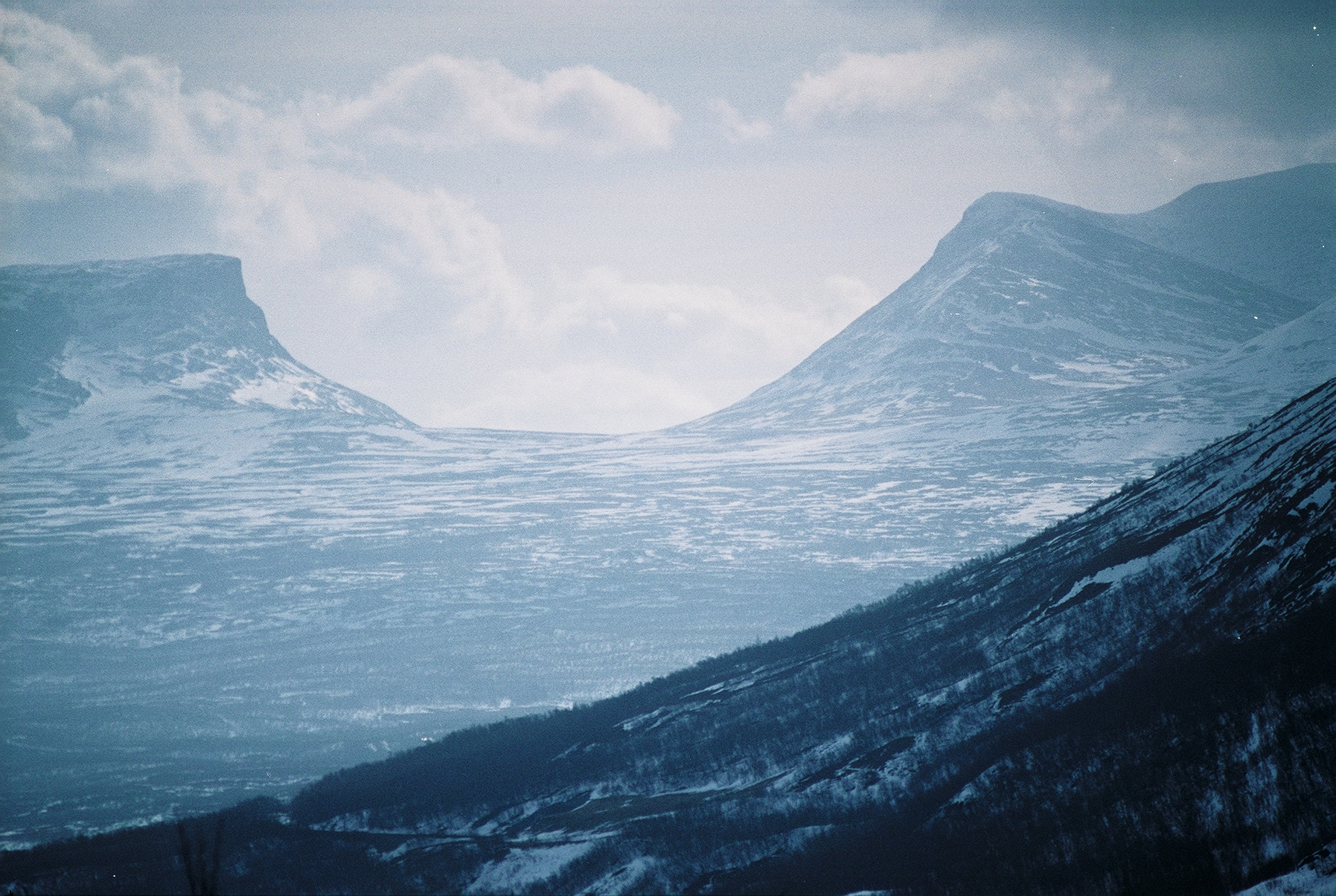
The wintery Lapporten mountain pass in Lappland, Sweden.

The climate of the Nordic countries is that of a region in Northern Europe that consists of Denmark, Finland, Iceland, Norway and Sweden and their associated territories, which include the Faroe Islands, Greenland and Åland. Stockholm, Sweden has on average the warmest summer of the Nordic capitals, with an average maximum temperature of 23 °C (73 °F) in July; Copenhagen, Oslo and Helsinki have an average July maximum temperature of 22 °C (72 °F).

== Seasonal conditions ==
=== Winter ===
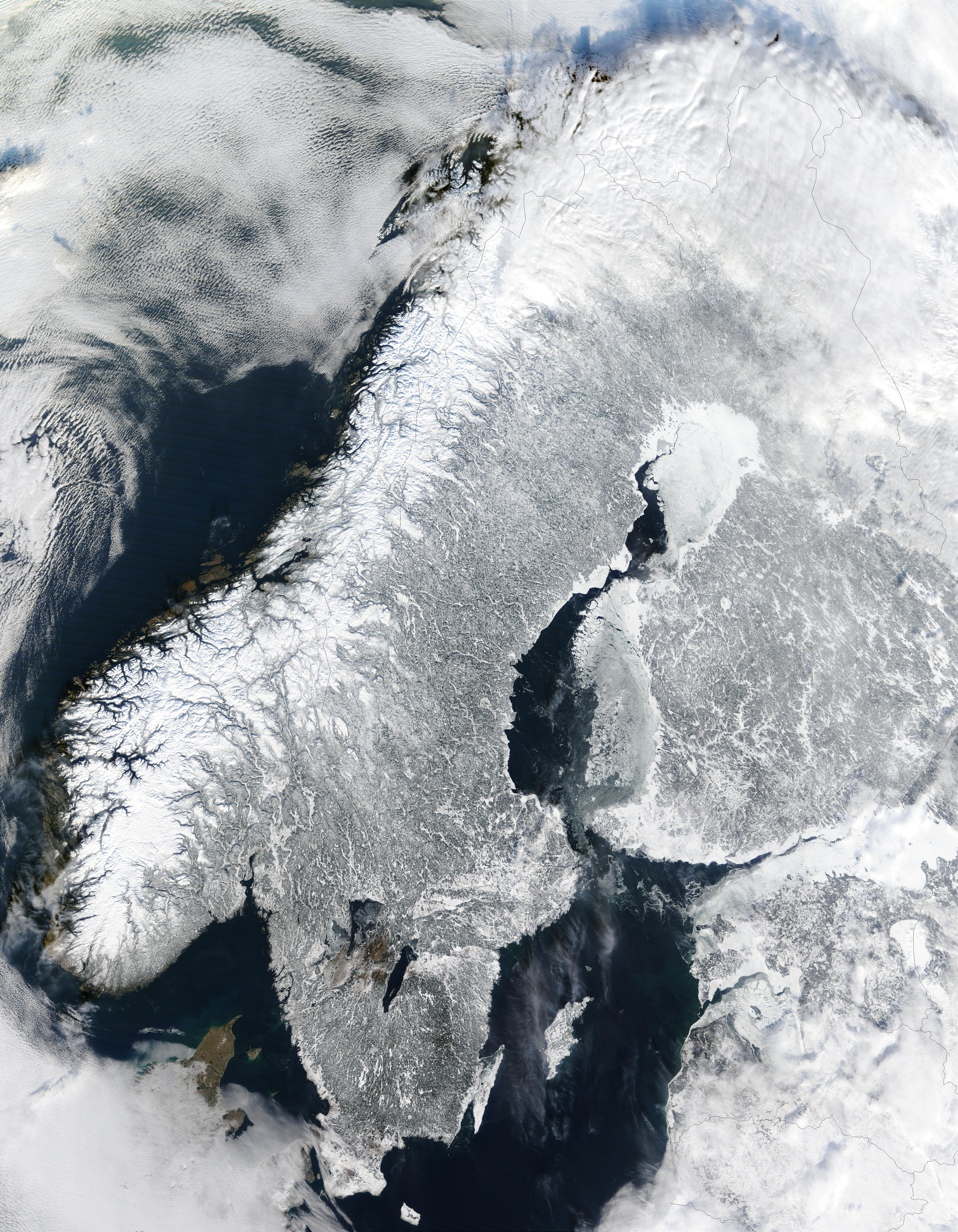
Scandinavia during wintertime

In Denmark, January temperatures average between −2 °C (28 °F) and 4 °C (39 °F). Denmark's coldest month, however, is February, when the mean temperature is 0 °C (32 °F). The number of hours of sunlight per day does increase during the month of February for Denmark, where they get seven to eight hours a day.

Iceland winters are generally mild considering how high its latitude is. The coastal lowlands of Iceland have average January temperatures of about 0 °C (32 °F), while the highlands of central Iceland generally stay below −10 °C (14 °F). The lowest winter temperatures in Iceland are usually somewhere between −25 °C (−13 °F) and −30 °C (−22 °F), although the lowest temperature ever recorded on Iceland was −39.7 °C (−39 °F).

In Norway, the coastal regions have mild winters, while further inland winter is much colder. During midwinter, southern areas of Norway only get five to six hours of sunlight a day, while the north gets little to none. In January, the average temperature in Norway is somewhere in between −6 °C (21 °F) and 3 °C (37 °F). Like neighboring Norway, Finland averages −6 °C (21 °F) to 1 °C (34 °F) in the month of January.

Finnish areas north of the Arctic Circle rarely see the sun rise, due to the natural phenomenon of the polar night. In January and February, temperatures in this area can drop to −15 °C (5 °F). In February, Northern Finland sees about four to six hours of daylight a day.

=== Spring ===
In Iceland, spring brings warmer and milder temperatures. In the month of May, the average temperature is somewhere between 4 °C (39 °F) and 10 °C (50 °F).

=== Summer ===
Denmark's warmest month is July, when the mean temperature is 17 °C (63 °F). In Iceland, occasionally thunderstorms occur in the south in late summertime, due to warm air being deflected to northern latitudes from warm air masses in other parts of Europe. Also, cold air originating from Canada, warms rapidly over the ocean, forming thunderclouds. Thunderstorms, however, are very rare in Iceland, and there are less than five of them per year. In June, Iceland's average daily temperatures range from 8 °C (46 °F) to 16 °C (61 °F). Summer conditions vary in Norway depending on location. The Norwegian coast has cooler summers than areas further inland. Due to its northern location, there is almost no darkness in June and July in the north, reaching as far south as Trondheim.

In summer, the average temperature in the Northern areas are somewhere between 8 °C (46 °F) and 16 °C (61 °F), while further South it is usually 13 °C (55 °F) to 22 °C (72 °F). In Finland, summers experience more rainfall than other seasons. Finland areas north of the Arctic Circle rarely see the sun set during the months of June and July, due to the natural phenomenon Midnight sun. Northern parts of Finland have summer temperatures in the 8 °C (46 °F) to 16 °C (61 °F) range, while further south, the temperature is closer to 13 °C (55 °F) and 23 °C (73 °F). During summer in Greenland, ice sheets breaking up trigger what is known as "glacial motion" or "glacial earthquakes".

== Global warming ==
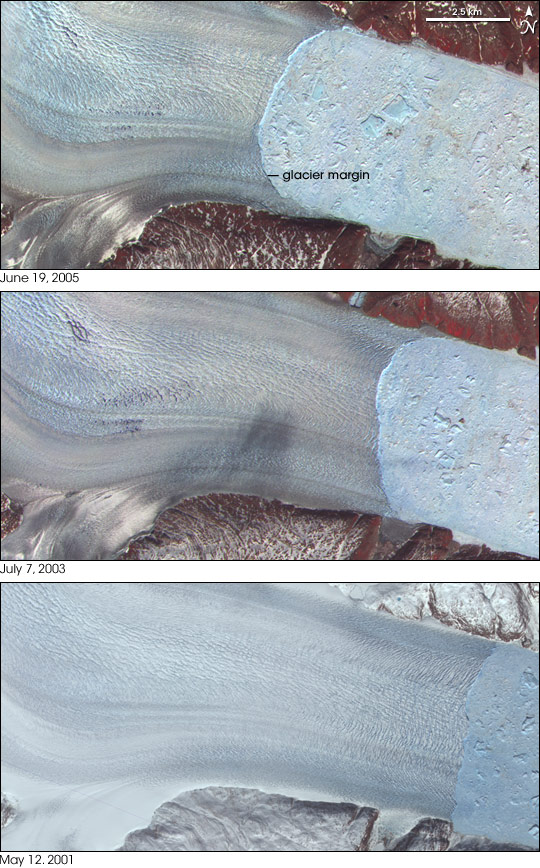
Retreat of the Helheim Glacier, Greenland

=== Effects ===
Greenland is one of the areas in both the Nordic region and the world most affected by climate change. A July 2006 study completed by "The Journal of Climate", determined that the melting of Greenland's ice sheets was the single largest contributor to global sea level rise. The temperatures from the year 2000 to the present have caused several very large glaciers that had long been stable, to begin to melt away. Three glaciers that have been researched: Jakobshavn Isbræ, Helheim and Kangerdlugssuaq Glaciers, jointly drain more than 16% of the Greenland Ice Sheet.

Satellite images and aerial photographs from the 1950s and 1970s show that the front of the glacier had remained in the same place for decades. In 2001, the ice sheet began retreating rapidly, retreating 7.2 km (4.5 mi) between 2001 and 2005. It has also accelerated from 20 m (66 ft) to 32 m (105 ft) a day. Western Greenland's Jakobshavn Isbræ is generally considered the fastest moving glacier in the world, and has been moving continuously at speeds of over 24 m (79 ft) a day with a stable terminus since at least 1950. The glacier's ice tongue began to break apart in 2000, leading to almost complete disintegration in 2003, while the retreat rate doubled to over 30 m (98 ft) per day.

In the summer of 2005, the island of Uunartoq Qeqertoq was discovered off the eastern central coast of Greenland. Prior to 2005, many people assumed that Uunartoq Qeqertoq was actually a peninsula off Liverpool Land, however, the melting ice shelves revealed that it was only connected to the mainland by glacial ice.

=== Predicted effects ===
Scientists estimate that should the current rate of climate change continue, Greenland's ice sheet, which contains 630,000 cubic miles (2,600,000 km^{3}) of ice, could melt and cause global sea level to rise by 23 ft (7.0 m). Some climate experts have estimated that Greenland could be losing 80 cubic miles (330 km^{3}) of ice each year.

The 2008 Environmental Performance Index ranked countries based on the environmental performance of the country's policies. On the list, Norway was ranked 2nd, Sweden was 3rd, 4th was Finland, Iceland was ranked as 11th, and Denmark came in 26th.

== See also ==
- Climate
- Climate change
- Climate of Denmark
- Climate of Finland
- Climate of Iceland
- Climate of Norway
- Climate of Sweden
- Climate of the Arctic
- Climatology
- Meteorology
