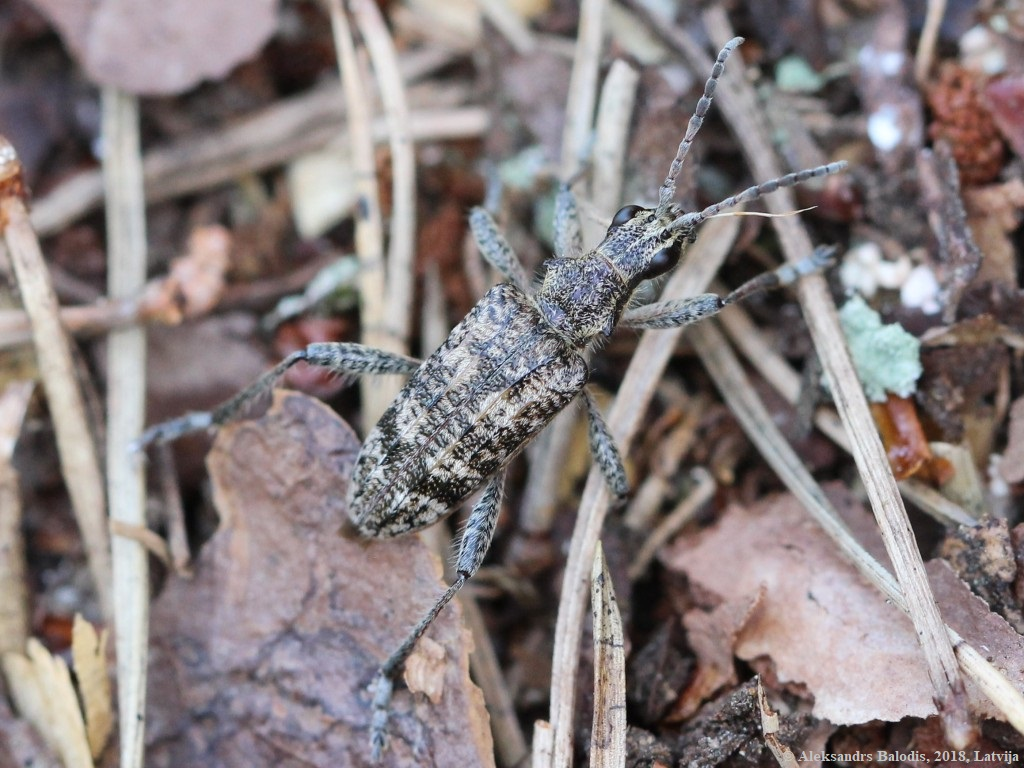
- Adult
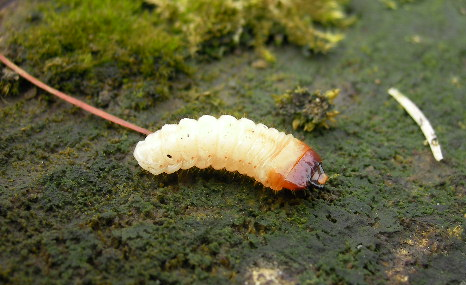
- Larva

Scientific classification
- Kingdom: Animalia
- Phylum: Arthropoda
- Clade: Pancrustacea
- Class: Insecta
- Order: Coleoptera
- Suborder: Polyphaga
- Infraorder: Cucujiformia
- Family: Cerambycidae
- Genus: Rhagium
- Species: R. inquisitor

Binomial name
- Rhagium inquisitor (Linnaeus, 1758)

= Rhagium inquisitor =

Species of beetle

Rhagium inquisitor, the “ribbed pine borer”, is a species of longhorn beetle in the family Cerambycidae. It was described by Carl Linnaeus in the 1758 10th edition of Systema Naturae as ‘‘Cerambyx inquisitor’’.The species is widely distributed in the Holarctic and is associated mainly with dead or recently felled coniferous wood.

== Taxonomy ==
‘‘Rhagium inquisitor’’ was first described by Linnaeus in 1758 under the name ‘‘Cerambyx inquisitor’’. It is now placed in the genus ‘’Rhagium’’, subfamily Lepturinae, and tribe Rhagiini.

A number of historical names have been treated as synonyms or combinations of the species, including ‘‘Cerambyx inquisitor’’, ‘‘Cerambyx nubeculus’’, ‘‘Rhagium indagator’’, and ‘‘Leptura inquisitor’’. Some authors have also discussed geographically variable forms and subspecies within the species complex.

== Description ==
Adults are medium-sized longhorn beetles, usually about 9–22 mm long. The body is dark brown to blackish and is covered with mottled grey, yellowish, or brown pubescence that provides camouflage on bark and dead wood. The elytra are strongly sculptured and have prominent longitudinal ribs, a feature reflected in the common name “ribbed pine borer”.

Unlike many longhorn beetles, the antennae are relatively short, usually much shorter than the body. The pronotum is broad and bears lateral projections or spines. The larvae are pale, soft-bodied wood-borers adapted to feeding beneath bark.

== Distribution ==
‘‘Rhagium inquisitor’’ is widely distributed across the Holarctic region. In Europe it occurs in coniferous and mixed forests over much of the continent, and it is also recorded from parts of North Africa, the Caucasus, Turkey, Russia, and northern Asia. In North America it is known from Canada and the United States, especially in boreal, montane, and other coniferous forest habitats.

== Habitat ==
The species is associated mainly with coniferous and mixed forests containing dead wood, fallen trunks, stumps, windthrown trees, or freshly cut timber. Adults may be found on recently felled logs, stumps, bark surfaces, and occasionally flowers.

== Life cycle and behavior ==
The life cycle usually lasts about two years. Females lay eggs in bark crevices on dead, dying, or recently cut trees. The larvae feed beneath the bark, mainly in the inner bark and cambial region, producing irregular galleries packed with frass.

Mature larvae pupate beneath the bark in oval cells or chambers, often surrounded by coarse wood shavings or frass. Adults may overwinter in their pupal chambers and emerge in spring. In Europe, adults are generally recorded from April to July, although local flight periods vary with climate and altitude.

== Host plants ==
The larvae develop mainly in dead conifers. Recorded hosts include species of ‘’Pinus’’, ‘’Picea’’, ‘’Abies’’, and ‘’Larix’’. Development has also been reported from some deciduous trees, including ‘’Betula’’, ‘’Fagus’’, and ‘’Quercus’’. In North America, host records include conifers such as spruce, pine, larch, hemlock, and Douglas-fir.

== Ecological role ==
‘‘Rhagium inquisitor’’ is a saproxylic beetle, depending on dead or recently dead wood for larval development. By feeding beneath bark, the larvae contribute to the breakdown of dead wood and the recycling of nutrients in forest ecosystems. Because the species normally uses dead, dying, or freshly cut trees rather than healthy living trees, it is not usually regarded as a serious forest pest.
