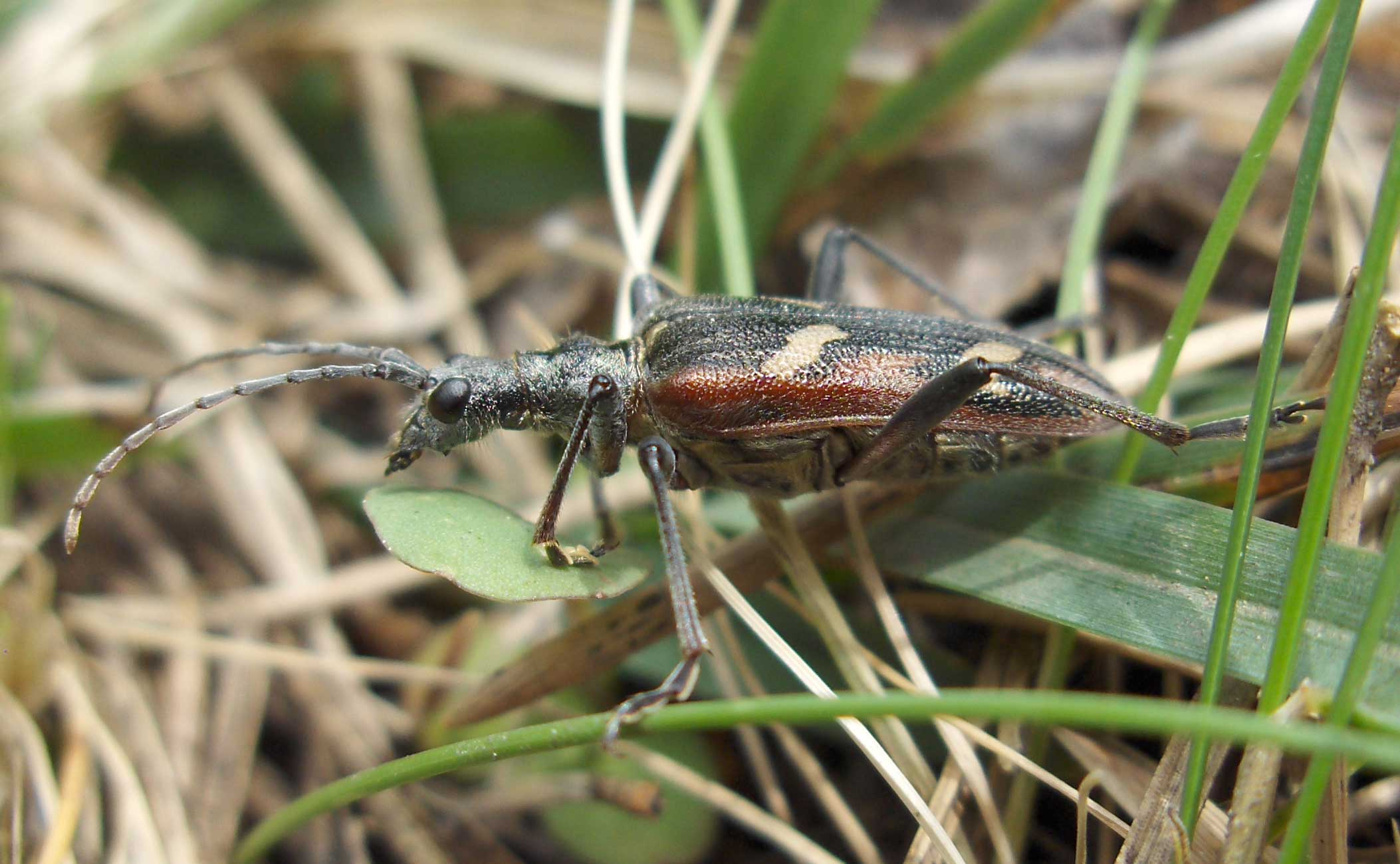

Scientific classification
- Domain: Eukaryota
- Kingdom: Animalia
- Phylum: Arthropoda
- Class: Insecta
- Order: Coleoptera
- Suborder: Polyphaga
- Infraorder: Cucujiformia
- Family: Cerambycidae
- Genus: Rhagium
- Species: R. bifasciatum

Binomial name
- Rhagium bifasciatum Fabricius, 1775

= Rhagium bifasciatum =

Species of beetle

Rhagium bifasciatum, sometimes called the two-banded longhorn beetle, is one of the most common longhorn beetles in Europe, Turkey and the Caucasus, although it is absent from the far north-east of Europe and some offshore islands, such as Malta. It may reach 22 millimetres (0.87 in) long and can be distinguished by the two prominent pale yellow bands on each of the elytra, although up to seventeen different patterns have been recognised.

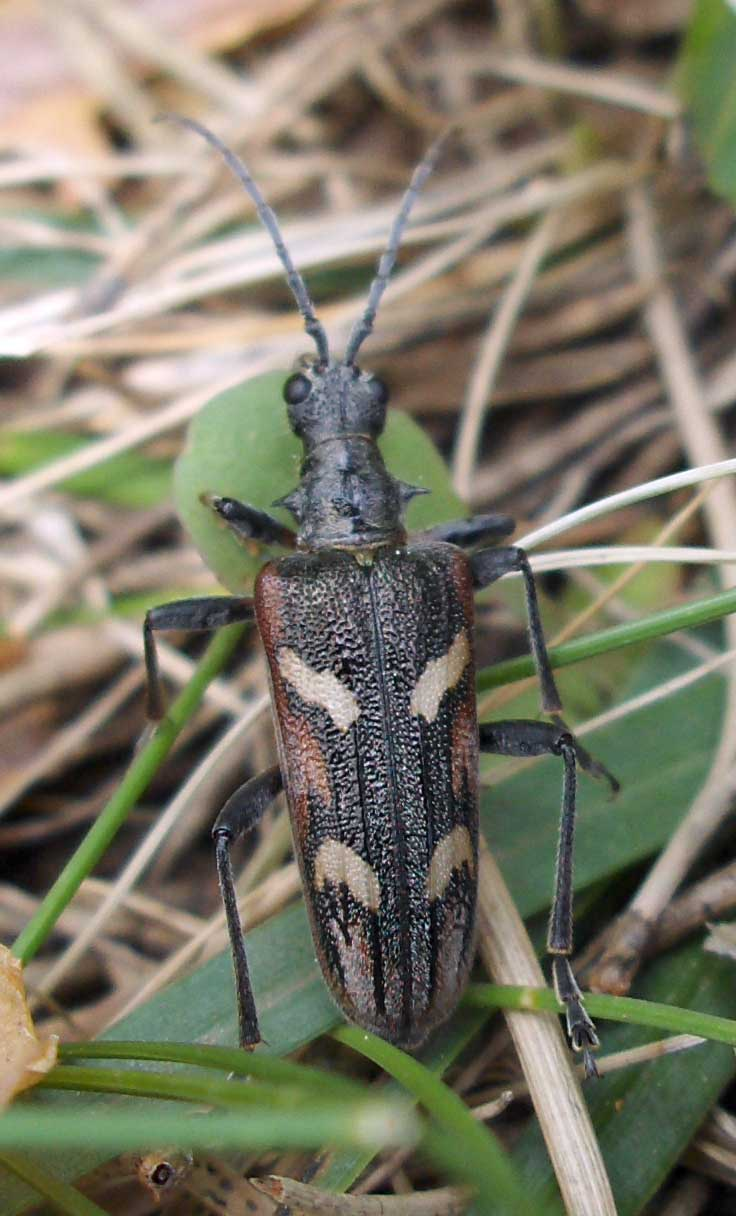
Dorsal view showing the distinctive elytral markings

Like other longhorn beetles, R. bifasciatum lays its eggs in dead wood, mostly of coniferous trees, where they bore deep, broad tunnels until they are ready to pupate after about two years. The adults feed on a wide variety of coniferous and broad-leaved trees.
