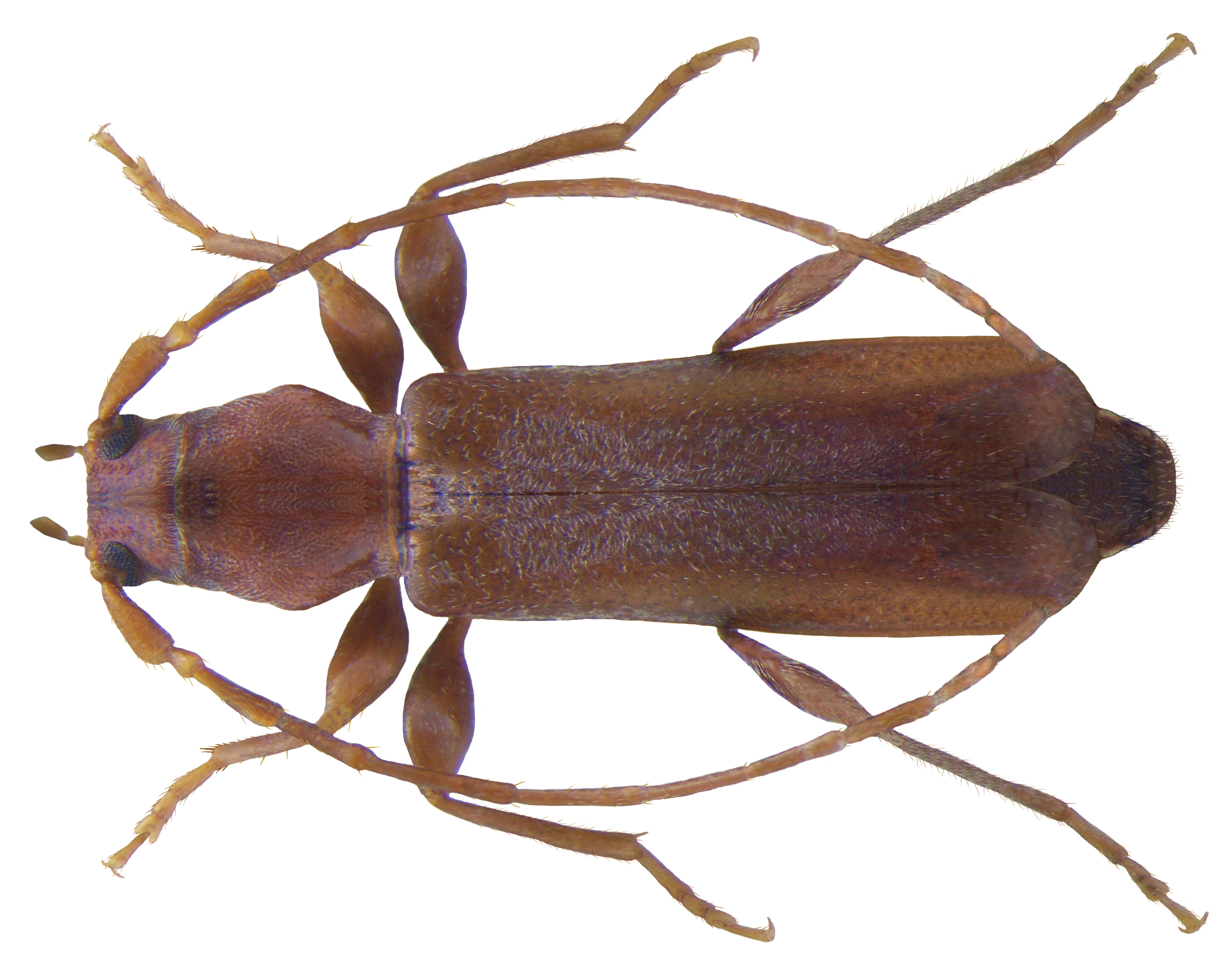
- Gracilia minuta

Scientific classification
- Kingdom: Animalia
- Phylum: Arthropoda
- Clade: Pancrustacea
- Class: Insecta
- Order: Coleoptera
- Suborder: Polyphaga
- Infraorder: Cucujiformia
- Family: Cerambycidae
- Subfamily: Cerambycinae
- Tribe: Graciliini; Mulsant, 1839

= Graciliini =

Tribe of beetles

Graciliini is a tribe of beetles in the subfamily Cerambycinae, containing the following genera:

- Ambagous Fairmaire, 1896
- Araeotis Bates, 1867
- Aruama Martins & Napp, 2007
- Axinopalpis Dejean, 1835
- Bolivarita Escalera, 1914
- Caribbomerus Vitali, 2003
- Elaphopsis Audinet-Serville, 1834
- Gracilia Audinet-Serville, 1834
- Hybometopia Ganglbauer, 1889
- Hypexilis Horn, 1885
- Idobrium Kolbe, 1902
- Ischnorrhabda Ganglbauer, 1889
- Lianema Fall, 1907
- Lucasianus Pic, 1891
- Parommidion Martins, 1974
- Neomicrus Gahan, 1894
- Nisibistum Thomson, 1878
- Penichroa Mulsant, 1863
- Perigracilia Linsley, 1942
- Pseudobolivarita Sama & Orbach, 2003
- Raglicia Martins, Galileo & Santos-Silva, 2015
- Tritomacrus Newman, 1838
