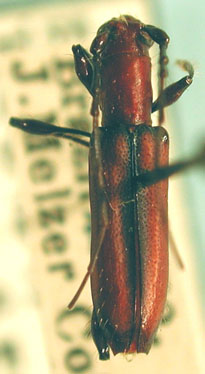

Scientific classification
- Kingdom: Animalia
- Phylum: Arthropoda
- Clade: Pancrustacea
- Class: Insecta
- Order: Coleoptera
- Suborder: Polyphaga
- Infraorder: Cucujiformia
- Family: Cerambycidae
- Genus: Elaphopsis
- Species: E. rubidus

Binomial name
- Elaphopsis rubidus Audinet-Serville, 1834

= Elaphopsis rubidus =

Species of beetle

Elaphopsis rubidus is a species of beetle in the family Cerambycidae. It was described by Audinet-Serville in 1834. It is found in Brazil (Bahia, Minas Gerais, Espírito Santo, Rio de Janeiro, São Paulo, Paraná, Santa Catarina, Rio Grande do Sul).
