= Caribbomerus picturatus =

Scientific classification
- Kingdom: Animalia
- Phylum: Arthropoda
- Class: Insecta
- Order: Coleoptera
- Suborder: Polyphaga
- Infraorder: Cucujiformia
- Family: Cerambycidae
- Genus: Caribbomerus
- Species: C. picturatus

Binomial name
- Caribbomerus picturatus (Napp & Martins, 1984)

Species of beetle

Caribbomerus picturatus is a species of beetle in the family Cerambycidae. It was described by Napp and Martins in 1984.
