= Caribbomerus productus =

Scientific classification
- Kingdom: Animalia
- Phylum: Arthropoda
- Class: Insecta
- Order: Coleoptera
- Suborder: Polyphaga
- Infraorder: Cucujiformia
- Family: Cerambycidae
- Genus: Caribbomerus
- Species: C. productus

Binomial name
- Caribbomerus productus (White, 1855)

Species of beetle

Caribbomerus productus is a species of beetle in the family Cerambycidae. It was described by White in 1855.
