= Parommidion =

Scientific classification
- Kingdom: Animalia
- Phylum: Arthropoda
- Class: Insecta
- Order: Coleoptera
- Suborder: Polyphaga
- Infraorder: Cucujiformia
- Family: Cerambycidae
- Tribe: Graciliini
- Genus: Parommidion

Genus of beetles

Parommidion is a genus of beetles in the family Cerambycidae, containing the following species:

- Parommidion extricatum Martins, 1974
- Parommidion inauditum Napp & Martins, 1984
