= Caribbomerus =

Scientific classification
- Kingdom: Animalia
- Phylum: Arthropoda
- Class: Insecta
- Order: Coleoptera
- Suborder: Polyphaga
- Infraorder: Cucujiformia
- Family: Cerambycidae
- Subfamily: Cerambycinae
- Tribe: Graciliini
- Genus: Caribbomerus; Vitali & Rezbanyai-Reser, 2003

Genus of beetles

Caribbomerus is a genus of beetles belonging to the family Cerambycidae, containing the following species:

- Caribbomerus asperatus (Fisher, 1932)
- Caribbomerus attenuatus (Chevrolat, 1862)
- Caribbomerus brasiliensis (Napp & Martins, 1984)
- Caribbomerus charynae (Micheli, 2003)
- Caribbomerus decoratus (Zayas, 1975)
- Caribbomerus elieri Devesa & Santos-Silva, 2021
- Caribbomerus elongatus (Fisher, 1932)
- Caribbomerus jaliscanus Heffern, Santos-Silva & Nascimento, 2021
- Caribbomerus mexicanus (Napp & Martins, 1984)
- Caribbomerus picturatus (Napp & Martins, 1984)
- Caribbomerus productus (White, 1855)
- Caribbomerus similis (Fisher, 1932)
- Caribbomerus zayasi Devesa & Santos-Silva, 2021
