= Hypexilis =

Scientific classification
- Kingdom: Animalia
- Phylum: Arthropoda
- Class: Insecta
- Order: Coleoptera
- Suborder: Polyphaga
- Infraorder: Cucujiformia
- Family: Cerambycidae
- Tribe: Graciliini
- Genus: Hypexilis

Genus of beetles

Hypexilis is a genus of beetles in the family Cerambycidae, containing the following species:

- Hypexilis longipennis Linsley, 1935
- Hypexilis pallida Horn, 1885
