= Perigracilia tenuis =

Scientific classification
- Kingdom: Animalia
- Phylum: Arthropoda
- Class: Insecta
- Order: Coleoptera
- Suborder: Polyphaga
- Infraorder: Cucujiformia
- Family: Cerambycidae
- Genus: Perigracilia
- Species: P. tenuis

Binomial name
- Perigracilia tenuis Linsley, 1942

Species of beetle

Perigracilia tenuis is a species of beetle in the family Cerambycidae. It was described by Linsley in 1942.
