= Aruama viridis =

Scientific classification
- Kingdom: Animalia
- Phylum: Arthropoda
- Class: Insecta
- Order: Coleoptera
- Suborder: Polyphaga
- Infraorder: Cucujiformia
- Family: Cerambycidae
- Genus: Aruama
- Species: A. viridis

Binomial name
- Aruama viridis Martins & Napp, 2007

Species of beetle

Aruama viridis is a species of beetle in the family Cerambycidae. It was described by Martins and Napp in 2007.
