= Caribbomerus charynae =

Scientific classification
- Kingdom: Animalia
- Phylum: Arthropoda
- Class: Insecta
- Order: Coleoptera
- Suborder: Polyphaga
- Infraorder: Cucujiformia
- Family: Cerambycidae
- Genus: Caribbomerus
- Species: C. charynae

Binomial name
- Caribbomerus charynae (Micheli, 2003)

Species of beetle

Caribbomerus charynae is a species of beetle in the family Cerambycidae. It was described by Micheli in 2003.
