= Hypexilis longipennis =

Scientific classification
- Kingdom: Animalia
- Phylum: Arthropoda
- Class: Insecta
- Order: Coleoptera
- Suborder: Polyphaga
- Infraorder: Cucujiformia
- Family: Cerambycidae
- Genus: Hypexilis
- Species: H. longipennis

Binomial name
- Hypexilis longipennis Linsley, 1935

Species of beetle

Hypexilis longipennis is a species of beetle in the family Cerambycidae. It was described by Linsley in 1935.
