= Perigracilia =

Scientific classification
- Kingdom: Animalia
- Phylum: Arthropoda
- Class: Insecta
- Order: Coleoptera
- Suborder: Polyphaga
- Infraorder: Cucujiformia
- Family: Cerambycidae
- Tribe: Graciliini
- Genus: Perigracilia; Linsley, 1942

Genus of beetles

Perigracilia is a genus of beetles in the family Cerambycidae, containing the following species:

- Perigracilia delicata Knull, 1942
- Perigracilia exigua (Zayas, 1975)
- Perigracilia tenuis Linsley, 1942
