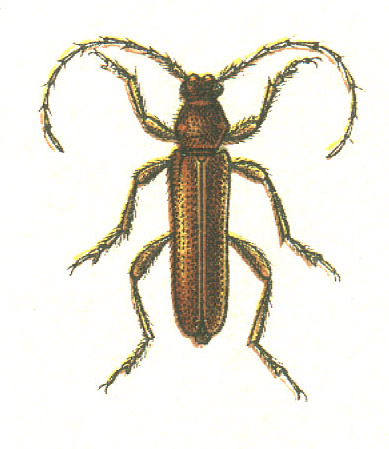
- Axinopalpis gracilis

Scientific classification
- Kingdom: Animalia
- Phylum: Arthropoda
- Class: Insecta
- Order: Coleoptera
- Suborder: Polyphaga
- Infraorder: Cucujiformia
- Family: Cerambycidae
- Subfamily: Cerambycinae
- Tribe: Graciliini
- Genus: Axinopalpis; Dejean, 1835

Species
- Axinopalpis alberti Sama, Rapuzzi & Kairouz, 2010; Axinopalpis barbarae Sama, 1992; Axinopalpis gracilis (Krynicki, 1832)

= Axinopalpis =

Genus of beetles

Axinopalpis is a genus of longhorn beetles.
