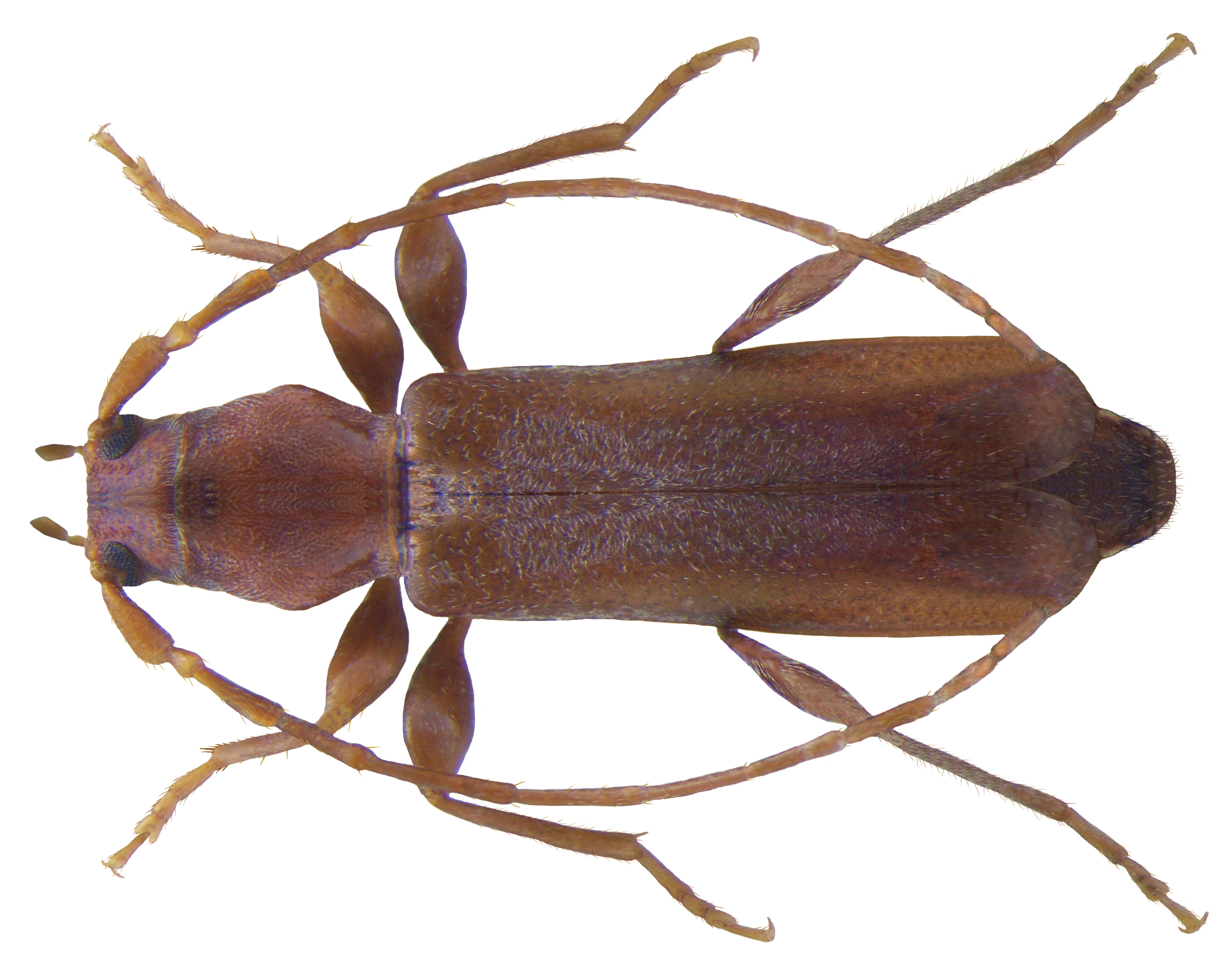
- Gracilia minuta, basket beetle

Scientific classification
- Kingdom: Animalia
- Phylum: Arthropoda
- Clade: Pancrustacea
- Class: Insecta
- Order: Coleoptera
- Suborder: Polyphaga
- Infraorder: Cucujiformia
- Family: Cerambycidae
- Subfamily: Cerambycinae
- Tribe: Graciliini
- Genus: Gracilia; Audinet-Serville, 1834
- Species: G. minuta

Binomial name
- Gracilia minuta (Fabricius, 1781)

Synonyms
- Nothrus Haldeman, 1847; Oesyophila Bedel, 1894

= Gracilia =

Genus of beetles

Gracilia is a genus of longhorn beetles in the family Cerambycidae. This genus has a single species, Gracilia minuta. It is native to Europe and has been introduced to the United States, Argentina, and Uruguay.

It is a slender beetle 4–6 mm (0.16–0.24 in) in length. The rear edge of the pronotum is simple. The third segment of the antenna is noticeably shorter than the fifth. The hair covering the elytra is arranged horizontally

Gracilia minuta is found in various habitats, including gardens and wood structures. The larvae develop in dead twigs and branches of broadleaf trees and conifers, and the adults are active from April to August, feeding on bark, leaves, or pollen.
