= Perigracilia exigua =

Scientific classification
- Kingdom: Animalia
- Phylum: Arthropoda
- Class: Insecta
- Order: Coleoptera
- Suborder: Polyphaga
- Infraorder: Cucujiformia
- Family: Cerambycidae
- Genus: Perigracilia
- Species: P. exigua

Binomial name
- Perigracilia exigua (Zayas, 1975)

Species of beetle

Perigracilia exigua is a species of beetle in the family Cerambycidae. It was described by Zayas in 1975.
