= Caribbomerus elongatus =

Scientific classification
- Kingdom: Animalia
- Phylum: Arthropoda
- Class: Insecta
- Order: Coleoptera
- Suborder: Polyphaga
- Infraorder: Cucujiformia
- Family: Cerambycidae
- Genus: Caribbomerus
- Species: C. elongatus

Binomial name
- Caribbomerus elongatus (Fisher, 1932)

Species of beetle

Caribbomerus elongatus is a species of beetle in the family Cerambycidae. It was described by Fisher in 1932.
