= Aruama =

Scientific classification
- Kingdom: Animalia
- Phylum: Arthropoda
- Class: Insecta
- Order: Coleoptera
- Suborder: Polyphaga
- Infraorder: Cucujiformia
- Family: Cerambycidae
- Tribe: Graciliini
- Genus: Aruama

Genus of beetles

Aruama is a genus of beetles in the family Cerambycidae, containing the following species:

- Aruama incognita Martins & Napp, 2007
- Aruama viridis Martins & Napp, 2007
