= Elaphopsis =

Scientific classification
- Domain: Eukaryota
- Kingdom: Animalia
- Phylum: Arthropoda
- Class: Insecta
- Order: Coleoptera
- Suborder: Polyphaga
- Infraorder: Cucujiformia
- Family: Cerambycidae
- Tribe: Graciliini
- Genus: Elaphopsis

Genus of beetles

Elaphopsis is a genus of beetles in the family Cerambycidae, containing the following species:

- Elaphopsis earinus Martins & Napp, 1989
- Elaphopsis rubidus Audinet-Serville, 1834
