= Hypexilis pallida =

Scientific classification
- Kingdom: Animalia
- Phylum: Arthropoda
- Class: Insecta
- Order: Coleoptera
- Suborder: Polyphaga
- Infraorder: Cucujiformia
- Family: Cerambycidae
- Genus: Hypexilis
- Species: H. pallida

Binomial name
- Hypexilis pallida Horn, 1885

Species of beetle

Hypexilis pallida is a species of beetle in the family Cerambycidae. It was described by Horn in 1885.
