= Perigracilia delicata =

Scientific classification
- Kingdom: Animalia
- Phylum: Arthropoda
- Class: Insecta
- Order: Coleoptera
- Suborder: Polyphaga
- Infraorder: Cucujiformia
- Family: Cerambycidae
- Genus: Perigracilia
- Species: P. delicata

Binomial name
- Perigracilia delicata Knull, 1942

Species of beetle

Perigracilia delicata is a species of beetle in the family Cerambycidae. It was described by Knull in 1942.
