= Parommidion inauditum =

Scientific classification
- Kingdom: Animalia
- Phylum: Arthropoda
- Class: Insecta
- Order: Coleoptera
- Suborder: Polyphaga
- Infraorder: Cucujiformia
- Family: Cerambycidae
- Genus: Parommidion
- Species: P. inauditum

Binomial name
- Parommidion inauditum Napp & Martins, 1984

Species of beetle

Parommidion inauditum is a species of beetle in the family Cerambycidae. It was described by Napp and Martins in 1984.
