= Caribbomerus decoratus =

Scientific classification
- Kingdom: Animalia
- Phylum: Arthropoda
- Class: Insecta
- Order: Coleoptera
- Suborder: Polyphaga
- Infraorder: Cucujiformia
- Family: Cerambycidae
- Genus: Caribbomerus
- Species: C. decoratus

Binomial name
- Caribbomerus decoratus (Zayas, 1975)

Species of beetle

Caribbomerus decoratus is a species of beetle in the family Cerambycidae. It was described by Zayas in 1975.
