= Elaphopsis earinus =

Scientific classification
- Domain: Eukaryota
- Kingdom: Animalia
- Phylum: Arthropoda
- Class: Insecta
- Order: Coleoptera
- Suborder: Polyphaga
- Infraorder: Cucujiformia
- Family: Cerambycidae
- Genus: Elaphopsis
- Species: E. earinus

Binomial name
- Elaphopsis earinus Martins & Napp, 1989

Species of beetle

Elaphopsis earinus is a species of beetle in the family Cerambycidae. It was described by Martins and Napp in 1989.
