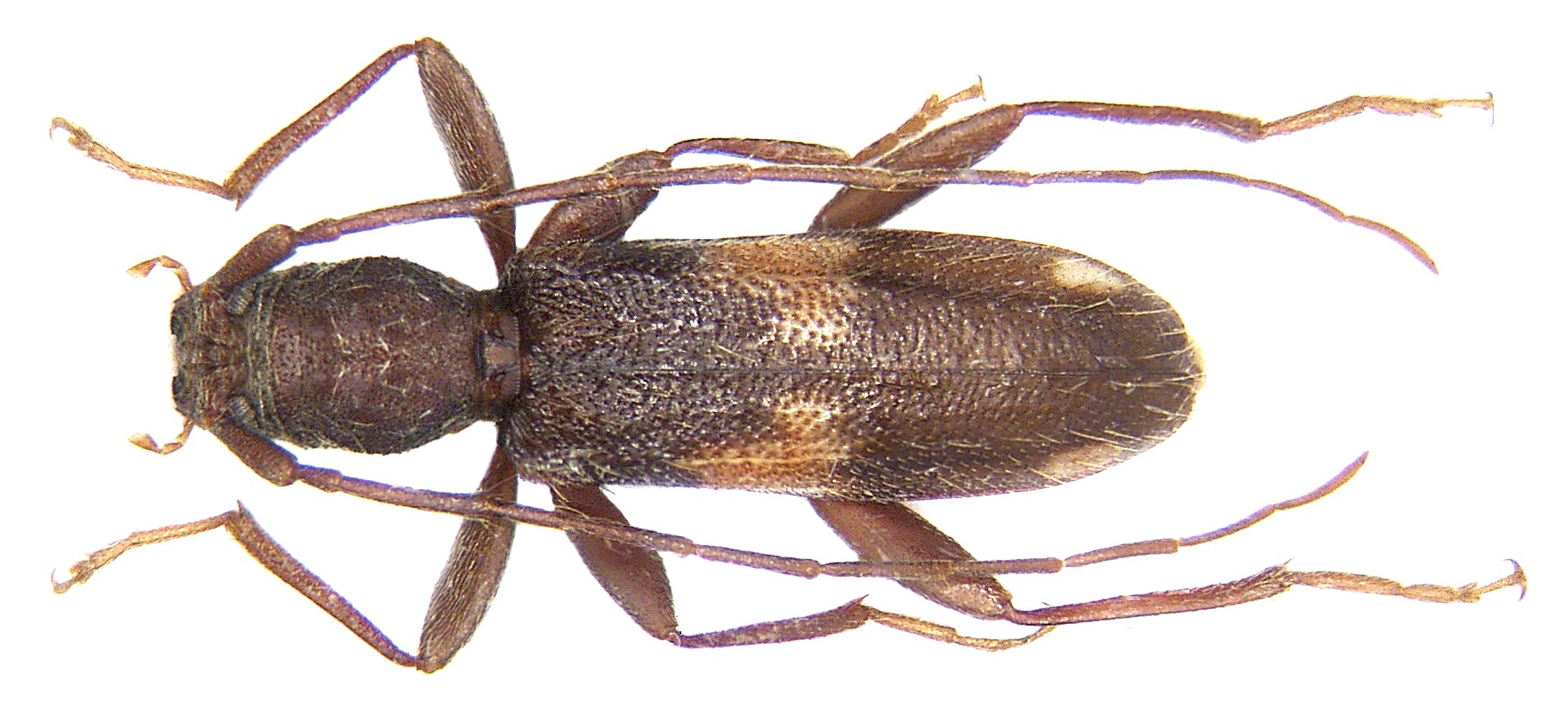

Scientific classification
- Kingdom: Animalia
- Phylum: Arthropoda
- Class: Insecta
- Order: Coleoptera
- Suborder: Polyphaga
- Infraorder: Cucujiformia
- Family: Cerambycidae
- Genus: Penichroa
- Species: P. fasciata

Binomial name
- Penichroa fasciata (Stephens, 1831)

= Penichroa =

Penichroa fasciata

Genus of beetles

Penichroa fasciata is a species of beetles in the family Cerambycidae, the only species in the genus Penichroa.
