= Araeotis =

Araeotis fragilis

Scientific classification
- Kingdom: Animalia
- Phylum: Arthropoda
- Class: Insecta
- Order: Coleoptera
- Suborder: Polyphaga
- Infraorder: Cucujiformia
- Family: Cerambycidae
- Genus: Araeotis
- Species: A. fragilis

Binomial name
- Araeotis fragilis Bates, 1867

Genus of beetles

Araeotis fragilis is a species of beetles in the family Cerambycidae, the only species in the genus Araeotis.
