= Lianema =

Lianema tenuicornis

Scientific classification
- Kingdom: Animalia
- Phylum: Arthropoda
- Class: Insecta
- Order: Coleoptera
- Suborder: Polyphaga
- Infraorder: Cucujiformia
- Family: Cerambycidae
- Genus: Lianema
- Species: L. tenuicornis

Binomial name
- Lianema tenuicornis Fall, 1907

Genus of beetles

Lianema tenuicornis is a species of Insect in the family Cerambycidae, the only species in the genus Lianema.
