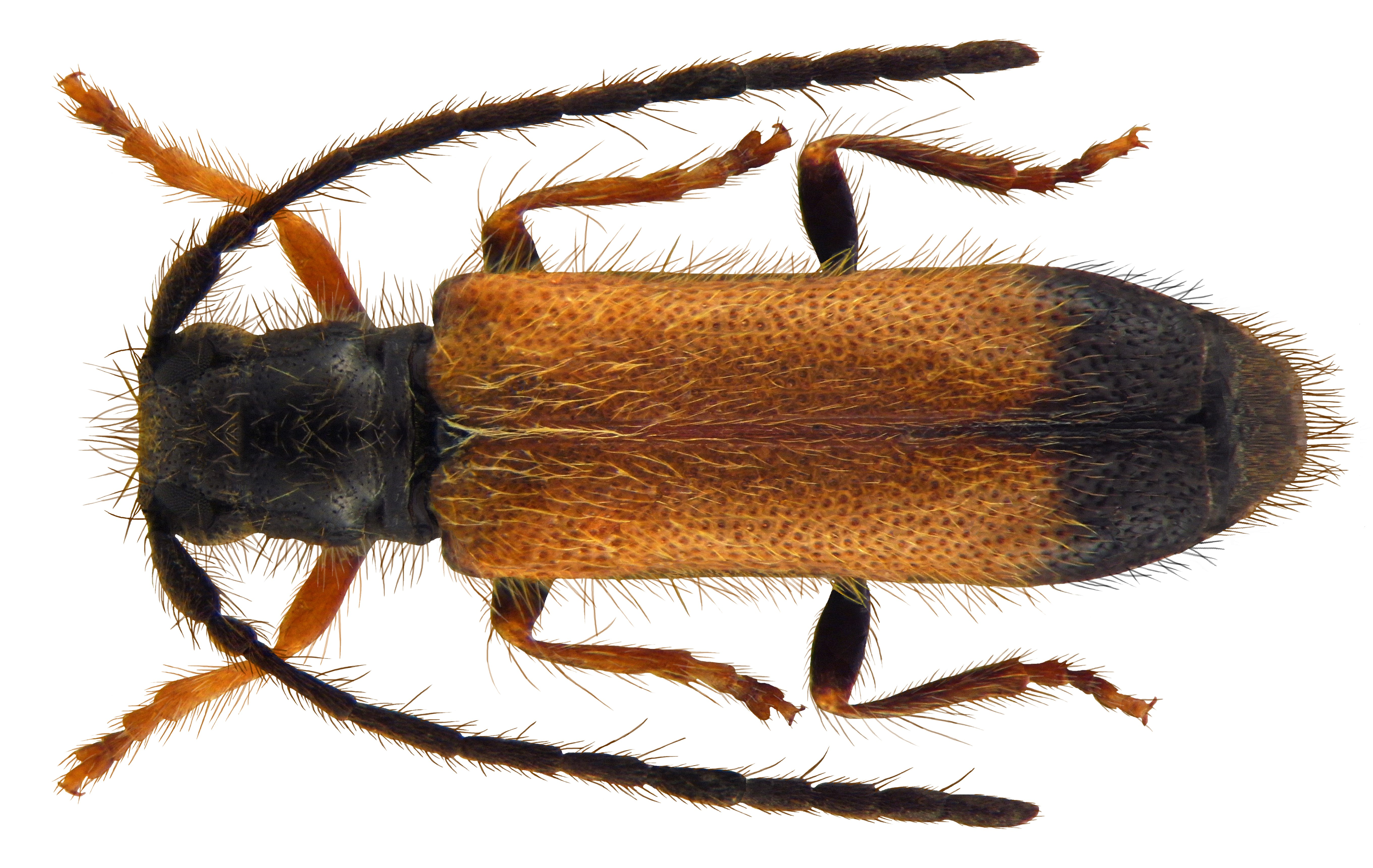
- Tetrops praeustus

Scientific classification
- Domain: Eukaryota
- Kingdom: Animalia
- Phylum: Arthropoda
- Class: Insecta
- Order: Coleoptera
- Suborder: Polyphaga
- Infraorder: Cucujiformia
- Family: Cerambycidae
- Tribe: Tetropini
- Genus: Tetrops; Stephens, 1829

Species
- see text

Synonyms
- Anaetia Dejean, 1835; Polyopsia Mulsant, 1839

= Tetrops =

Genus of beetles

Tetrops is a small genus of longhorn beetles found in Eurasia. One species, Tetrops praeustus, has recently been introduced in Eastern North America.

== Species ==
- Tetrops algiricus
- Tetrops bicoloricornis
- Tetrops bivittulatus
- Tetrops brunneicornis
- Tetrops elaeagni
- Tetrops formosus
- Tetrops gilvipes
- Tetrops hauseri
- Tetrops mongolicus
- Tetrops praeustus
- Tetrops rosarum
- Tetrops songaricus
- Tetrops starkii
- Tetrops warnckei
