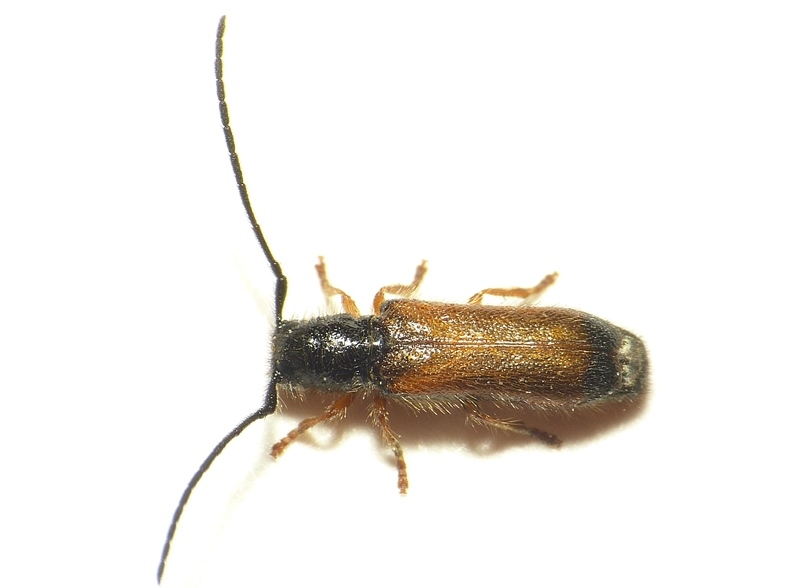
- Tetrops starkii

Scientific classification
- Domain: Eukaryota
- Kingdom: Animalia
- Phylum: Arthropoda
- Class: Insecta
- Order: Coleoptera
- Suborder: Polyphaga
- Infraorder: Cucujiformia
- Family: Cerambycidae
- Subfamily: Lamiinae
- Tribe: Tetropini; Planet, 1924

= Tetropini =

Tribe of beetles

Tetropini is a tribe of longhorn beetles of the subfamily Lamiinae.

== Genera ==
- Lenotetrops Danilevsky, 2012
- Paratetrops Lazarev, 2024
- Tetrops Stephens, 1829
