= Tetrops elaeagni =

Scientific classification
- Domain: Eukaryota
- Kingdom: Animalia
- Phylum: Arthropoda
- Class: Insecta
- Order: Coleoptera
- Suborder: Polyphaga
- Infraorder: Cucujiformia
- Family: Cerambycidae
- Genus: Tetrops
- Species: T. elaeagni

Binomial name
- Tetrops elaeagni Plavilstshikov, 1954

Synonyms
- Tetrops eleagri Plavilstshikov, 1954; Tetrops eleagni Plavilstshikov, 1954

Species of beetle

Tetrops elaeagni is a species of beetle in the family Cerambycidae. It was described by Nikolay Nikolaevich Plavilstshchikov in 1954. It is known from Russia, Kazakhstan, China, Uzbekistan, and Turkmenistan.

== Subspecies ==
- Tetrops elaeagni shapovalovi Danilevsky, 2018
- Tetrops elaeagni elaeagni Plavilstshikov, 1954
- Tetrops elaeagni plaviltshikovi Kostin, 1973
