= Tetrops rosarum =

Scientific classification
- Domain: Eukaryota
- Kingdom: Animalia
- Phylum: Arthropoda
- Class: Insecta
- Order: Coleoptera
- Suborder: Polyphaga
- Infraorder: Cucujiformia
- Family: Cerambycidae
- Genus: Tetrops
- Species: T. rosarum

Binomial name
- Tetrops rosarum Tsherepanov, 1975

Species of beetle

Tetrops rosarum is a species of beetle in the family Cerambycidae. It was described by Tsherepanov in 1975. It is known from Russia and possibly Mongolia.
