= Tetrops mongolicus =

Scientific classification
- Domain: Eukaryota
- Kingdom: Animalia
- Phylum: Arthropoda
- Class: Insecta
- Order: Coleoptera
- Suborder: Polyphaga
- Infraorder: Cucujiformia
- Family: Cerambycidae
- Genus: Tetrops
- Species: T. mongolicus

Binomial name
- Tetrops mongolicus Murzin, 1977

Species of beetle

Tetrops mongolicus is a species of beetle in the family Cerambycidae. It was described by Murzin in 1977. It is known from Mongolia.
