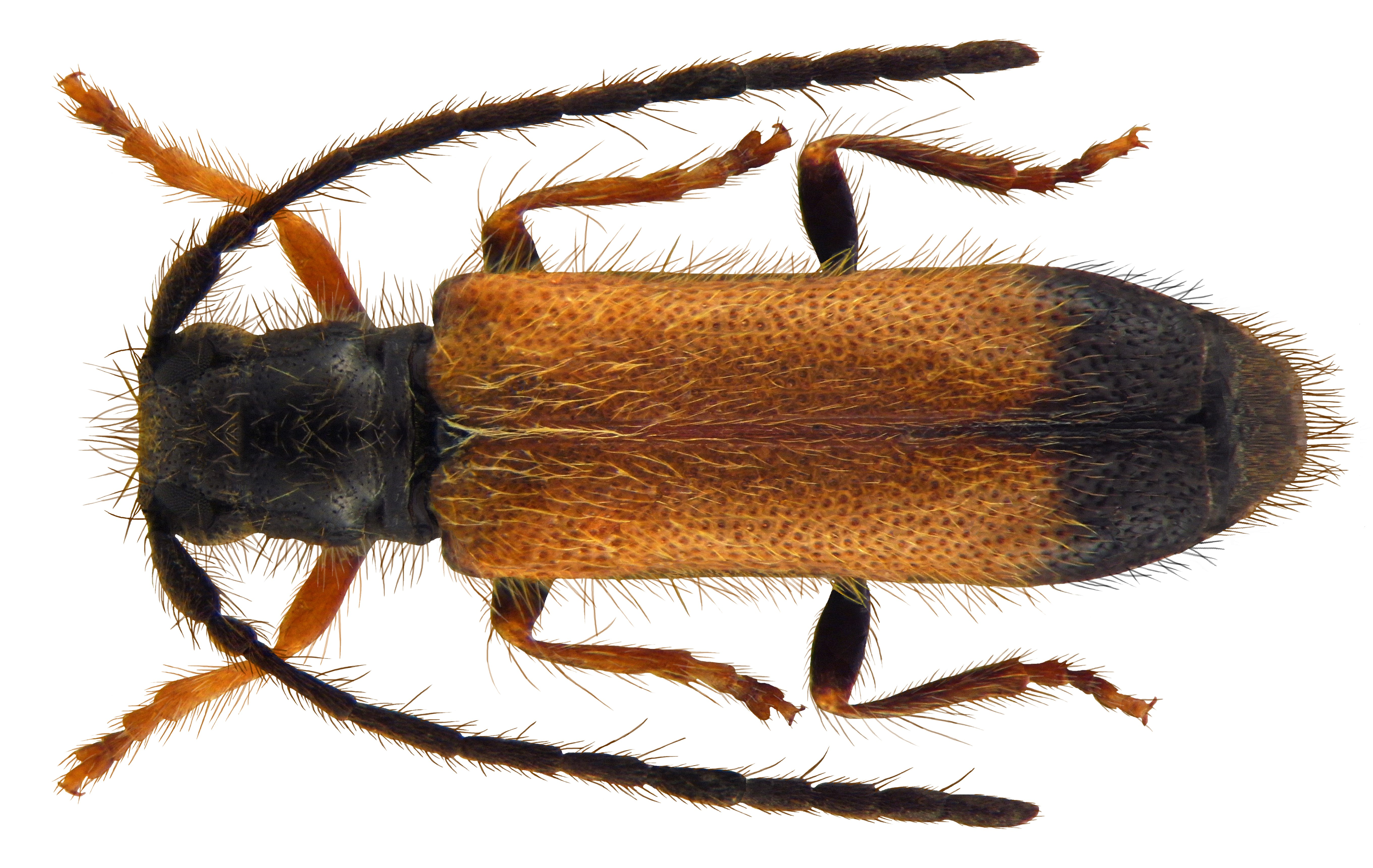

Scientific classification
- Kingdom: Animalia
- Phylum: Arthropoda
- Clade: Pancrustacea
- Class: Insecta
- Order: Coleoptera
- Suborder: Polyphaga
- Infraorder: Cucujiformia
- Family: Cerambycidae
- Genus: Tetrops
- Species: T. praeustus

Binomial name
- Tetrops praeustus (Linnaeus, 1758)

Synonyms
- Leptura praeusta Linnaeus, 1758; Leptura pilosa Geoffroy, 1758; Cerambyx iocusthus Voet, 1781 (Unav.); Saperda ustulata Hagenbach, 1822; Tetrops praecesta Dufour, 1843 (Lapsus); Tetrops proeusta [sic] v. inapicalis Pic, 1891; Tetrops praeusta v. algirica Chobaut, 1894; Tetrops praeustus angorensis Pic, 1918; Tetrops praeustus anatolicus Özdikmen & Turgut, 2008

= Tetrops praeustus =

Species of beetle

Tetrops praeustus (frequently misspelled as "praeusta") is a small longhorn beetle found in Europe. It has recently been introduced in eastern North America.
