= Lenotetrops =

Scientific classification
- Kingdom: Animalia
- Phylum: Arthropoda
- Class: Insecta
- Order: Coleoptera
- Suborder: Polyphaga
- Infraorder: Cucujiformia
- Family: Cerambycidae
- Tribe: Tetropini
- Genus: Lenotetrops; Danilevsky, 2012
- Species: L. ivanovae

Binomial name
- Lenotetrops ivanovae Danilevsky, 2012

Genus of beetles

Lenotetrops is a genus of longhorn beetles, containing a single species, L. ivanovae, found in Afghanistan.
