= Tetrops bicoloricornis =

Scientific classification
- Domain: Eukaryota
- Kingdom: Animalia
- Phylum: Arthropoda
- Class: Insecta
- Order: Coleoptera
- Suborder: Polyphaga
- Infraorder: Cucujiformia
- Family: Cerambycidae
- Genus: Tetrops
- Species: T. bicoloricornis

Binomial name
- Tetrops bicoloricornis Kostin, 1973

Synonyms
- Tetrops formosa m. bicoloricornis Plavilstshikov, 1954 (Unav.); Tetrops hauseri m. ruficollis Plavilstshikov, 1959 (Unav.); Tetrops hauseri bicoloricornis Kostin, 1973

Species of beetle

Tetrops bicoloricornis is a species of beetle in the family Cerambycidae. It is known from Kyrgyzstan.

== Subspecies ==
- Tetrops bicoloricornis ferganensis Danilevsky, 2018
- Tetrops bicoloricornis bicoloricornis Kostin, 1973
- Tetrops bicoloricornis oshensis Danilevsky, 2018
- Tetrops bicoloricornis nigricornis Danilevsky, 2018
