= Tetrops brunneicornis =

Scientific classification
- Domain: Eukaryota
- Kingdom: Animalia
- Phylum: Arthropoda
- Class: Insecta
- Order: Coleoptera
- Suborder: Polyphaga
- Infraorder: Cucujiformia
- Family: Cerambycidae
- Genus: Tetrops
- Species: T. brunneicornis

Binomial name
- Tetrops brunneicornis Pu, 1985

Species of beetle

Tetrops brunneicornis is a species of beetle in the family Cerambycidae. It was described by Pu in 1985. It is known from China.
