= Tetrops formosus =

Scientific classification
- Domain: Eukaryota
- Kingdom: Animalia
- Phylum: Arthropoda
- Class: Insecta
- Order: Coleoptera
- Suborder: Polyphaga
- Infraorder: Cucujiformia
- Family: Cerambycidae
- Genus: Tetrops
- Species: T. formosus

Binomial name
- Tetrops formosus Baeckmann, 1903

Synonyms
- Tetrops formosa Baeckmann, 1903

Species of beetle

Tetrops formosus is a species of beetle in the family Cerambycidae. It was described by Baeckmann in 1903. It is known from Kazakhstan, China, and Kyrgyzstan.

== Subspecies ==
- Tetrops formosus formosus Baeckmann, 1903
- Tetrops formosus songaricus Kostin, 1973
- Tetrops formosus bivittulatus Jankovskij, 1934
- Tetrops formosus strandiellus (Breuning, 1943)
