= Tetrops hauseri =

Scientific classification
- Kingdom: Animalia
- Phylum: Arthropoda
- Class: Insecta
- Order: Coleoptera
- Suborder: Polyphaga
- Infraorder: Cucujiformia
- Family: Cerambycidae
- Genus: Tetrops
- Species: T. hauseri

Binomial name
- Tetrops hauseri Reitter, 1897

Species of beetle

Tetrops hauseri is a species of beetle in the family Cerambycidae. It was described by Reitter in 1897. It is known from Kazakhstan and China.

== Subspecies ==
- Tetrops hauseri kostini Özdikmen & Turgut, 2008
- Tetrops hauseri hauseri Reitter, 1897
