= Tetrops gilvipes =

Scientific classification
- Domain: Eukaryota
- Kingdom: Animalia
- Phylum: Arthropoda
- Class: Insecta
- Order: Coleoptera
- Suborder: Polyphaga
- Infraorder: Cucujiformia
- Family: Cerambycidae
- Genus: Tetrops
- Species: T. gilvipes

Binomial name
- Tetrops gilvipes (Faldermann, 1837)

Synonyms
- Tetrops praeustus f. gilvipes (Faldermann, 1837); Tetrops praeusta gilvipes (Faldermann, 1837); Tetrops praeustus gilvipes (Faldermann, 1837); Anaetia gilvipes Faldermann, 1837

Species of beetle

Tetrops gilvipes is a species of beetle in the family Cerambycidae. It was described by Faldermann in 1837, originally under the genus Anaetia. It has a wide distribution in Europe. It feeds on Pyrus communis.

== Subspecies ==
In 2019 6 Subspzies are known:

- Tetrops gilvipes gilvipes (Faldermann, 1837)
- Tetrops gilvipes adlbaueri Lazarev, 2012
- Tetrops gilvipes efetovi Lazarev, 2012
- Tetrops gilvipes mikati Sláma, 2019
- Tetrops gilvipes murzini Lazarev, 2012
- Tetrops gilvipes niger Kraatz, 1859
