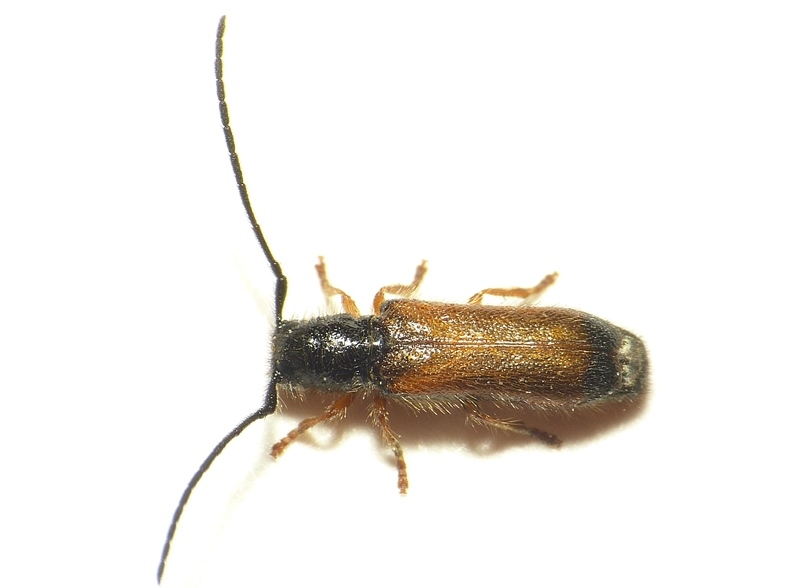

Scientific classification
- Domain: Eukaryota
- Kingdom: Animalia
- Phylum: Arthropoda
- Class: Insecta
- Order: Coleoptera
- Suborder: Polyphaga
- Infraorder: Cucujiformia
- Family: Cerambycidae
- Genus: Tetrops
- Species: T. starkii

Binomial name
- Tetrops starkii Chevrolat, 1859

Synonyms
- Tetrops starki Chevrolat, 1859; Tetrops praeusta var. starki (Chevrolat) Planet, 1924

= Tetrops starkii =

Species of beetle

Tetrops starkii is a species of beetle in the family Cerambycidae. It was described by Louis Alexandre Auguste Chevrolat in 1859. It has a wide distribution in Europe. It feeds on Fraxinus excelsior and Fraxinus angustifolia.

T. starkii measures between 5 and 4.5 mm (0.20 and 0.18 in).

== Varietas ==
- Tetrops starkii var. vicina Pic, 1928
- Tetrops starkii var. mesmini Pic, 1928
