= Paratetrops =

Scientific classification
- Kingdom: Animalia
- Phylum: Arthropoda
- Class: Insecta
- Order: Coleoptera
- Suborder: Polyphaga
- Infraorder: Cucujiformia
- Family: Cerambycidae
- Subfamily: Lamiinae
- Tribe: Tetropini
- Genus: Paratetrops; Lazarev, 2024
- Species: P. warnckei

Binomial name
- Paratetrops warnckei (Holzschuh), 1977

Synonyms
- Tetrops warnckei Holzschuh, 1977

Genus of beetles

Paratetrops, is a genus of beetles in the family Cerambycidae, containing one species from South Turkey, Paratetrops warnckei was described by Holzschuh in 1977 in the genus Tetrops. The genus was described by Lazarev in 2024. It is endemic to the Akseki (Toros Mts.) in South Turkey. "Close to Tetrops". Gender masculine.

The species was described from one female.
