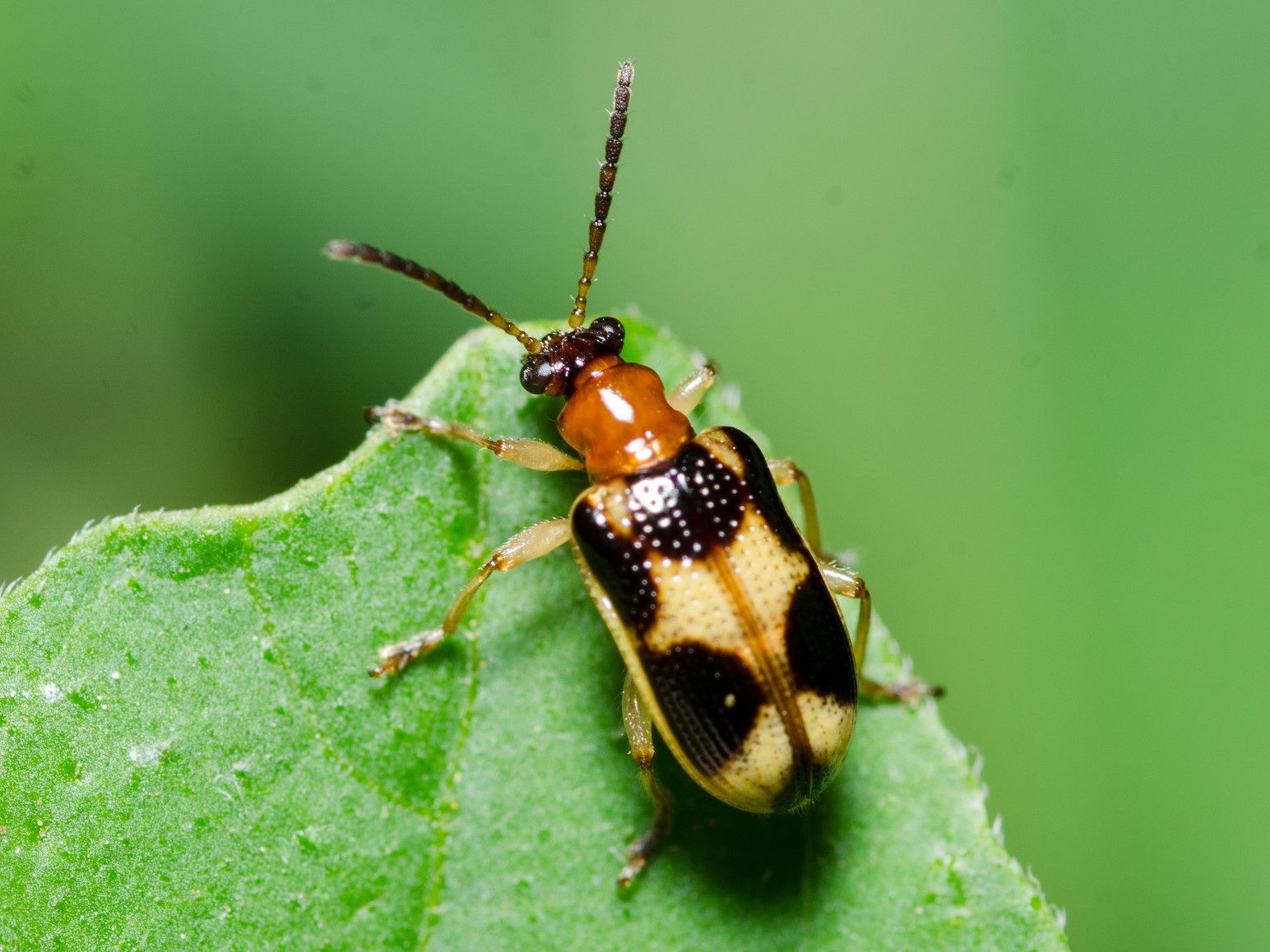

Scientific classification
- Domain: Eukaryota
- Kingdom: Animalia
- Phylum: Arthropoda
- Class: Insecta
- Order: Coleoptera
- Suborder: Polyphaga
- Infraorder: Cucujiformia
- Family: Chrysomelidae
- Subfamily: Criocerinae
- Tribe: Lemini
- Genus: Lema
- Species: L. opulenta

Binomial name
- Lema opulenta Harold in Gemminger & Harold, 1874

= Lema opulenta =

Species of beetle

Lema opulenta is a species of leaf beetle in the family Chrysomelidae. It is found in Central America and North America.
