= Oulema concolor =

Scientific classification
- Domain: Eukaryota
- Kingdom: Animalia
- Phylum: Arthropoda
- Class: Insecta
- Order: Coleoptera
- Suborder: Polyphaga
- Infraorder: Cucujiformia
- Family: Chrysomelidae
- Subfamily: Criocerinae
- Tribe: Lemini
- Genus: Oulema
- Species: O. concolor

Binomial name
- Oulema concolor (LeConte, 1884)

Species of beetle

Oulema concolor is a species of leaf beetle in the family Chrysomelidae. It is found in Central America and North America.
