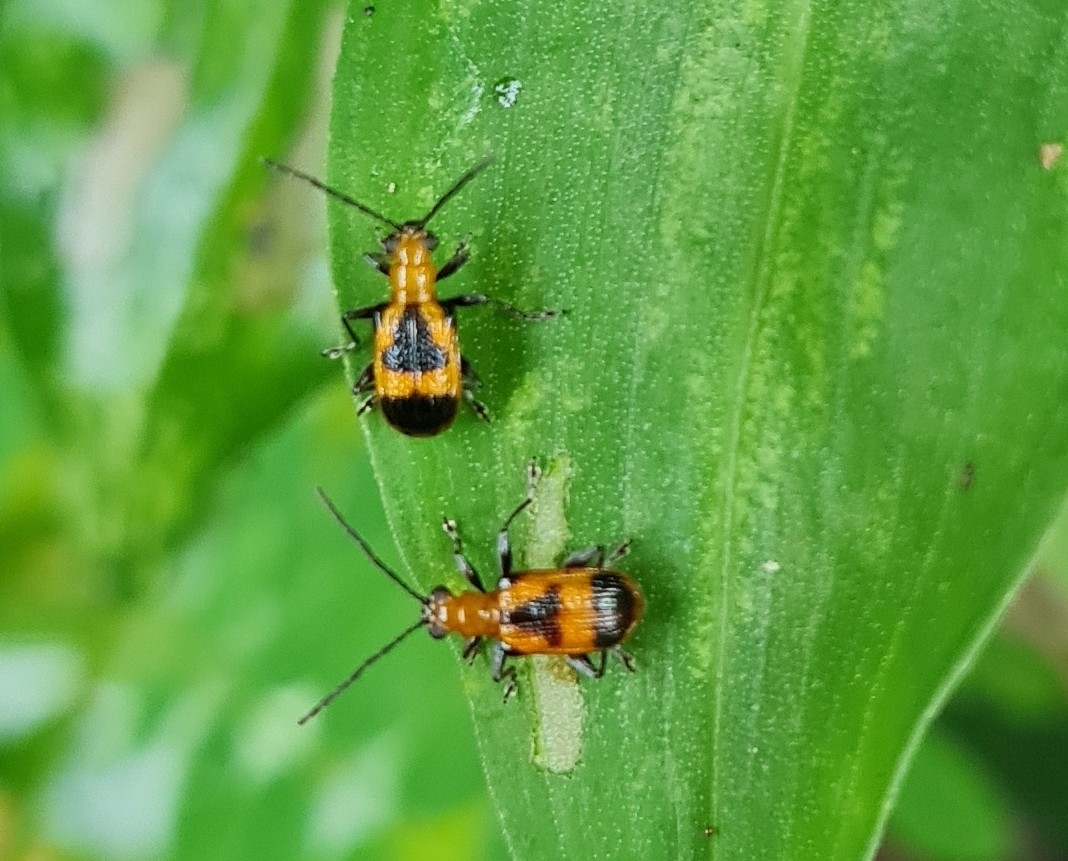

Scientific classification
- Kingdom: Animalia
- Phylum: Arthropoda
- Clade: Pancrustacea
- Class: Insecta
- Order: Coleoptera
- Suborder: Polyphaga
- Infraorder: Cucujiformia
- Family: Chrysomelidae
- Subfamily: Criocerinae
- Tribe: Lemini
- Genus: Neolema
- Species: N. dorsalis

Binomial name
- Neolema dorsalis (Olivier, 1791)

= Neolema dorsalis =

Species of beetle

Neolema dorsalis is a species of leaf beetle in the family Chrysomelidae. It is found in the Caribbean Sea, Central America, North America, and South America.
