= Oulema maculicollis =

Scientific classification
- Domain: Eukaryota
- Kingdom: Animalia
- Phylum: Arthropoda
- Class: Insecta
- Order: Coleoptera
- Suborder: Polyphaga
- Infraorder: Cucujiformia
- Family: Chrysomelidae
- Subfamily: Criocerinae
- Tribe: Lemini
- Genus: Oulema
- Species: O. maculicollis

Binomial name
- Oulema maculicollis (Lacordaire, 1845)

Species of beetle

Oulema maculicollis is a species of leaf beetle in the family Chrysomelidae. It is found in North America.
