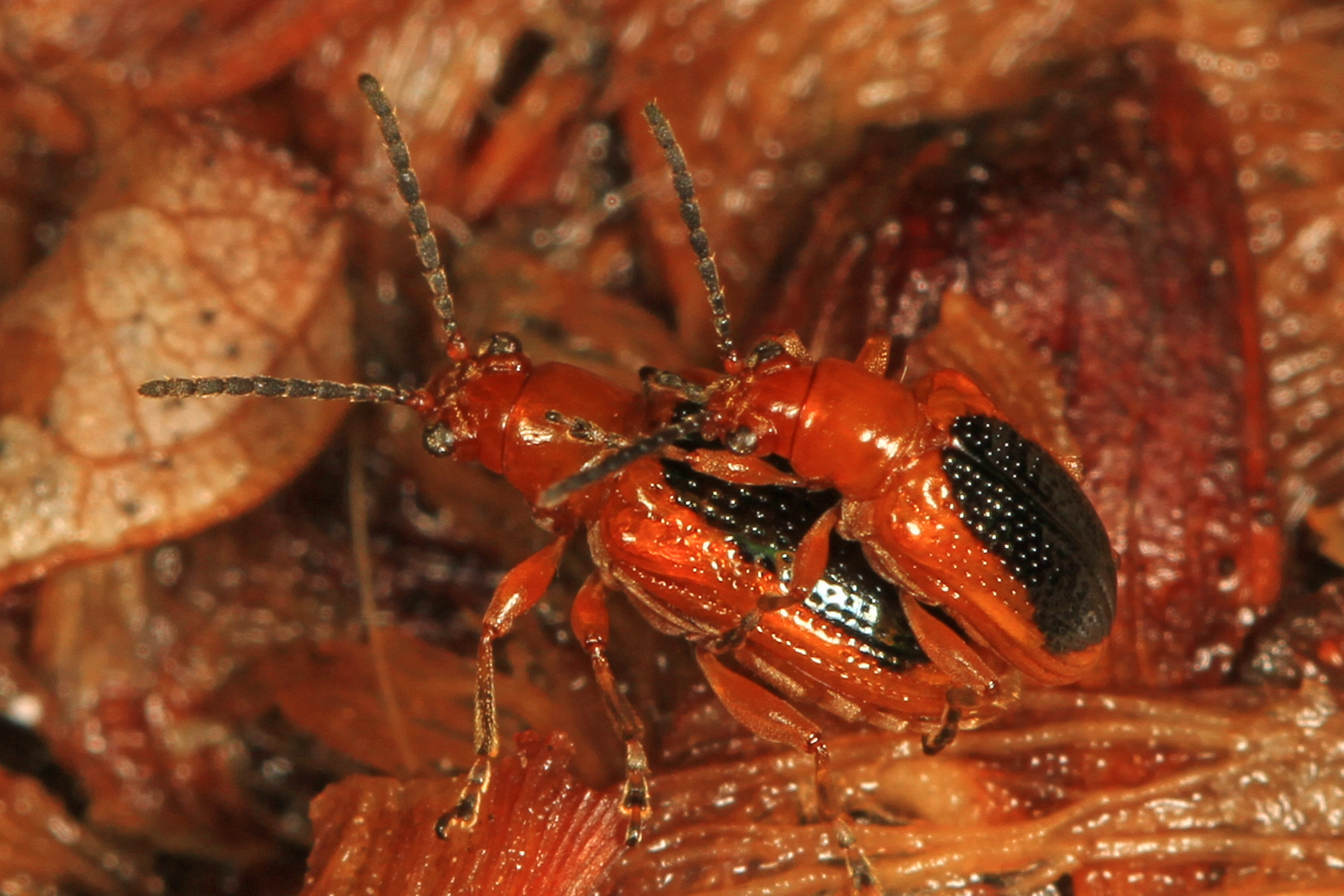

Scientific classification
- Domain: Eukaryota
- Kingdom: Animalia
- Phylum: Arthropoda
- Class: Insecta
- Order: Coleoptera
- Suborder: Polyphaga
- Infraorder: Cucujiformia
- Family: Chrysomelidae
- Subfamily: Criocerinae
- Tribe: Lemini
- Genus: Neolema
- Species: N. ovalis

Binomial name
- Neolema ovalis R. White, 1993

= Neolema ovalis =

Species of beetle

Neolema ovalis is a species of leaf beetle in the family Chrysomelidae. It is found in North America.
