= Oulema arizonae =

Scientific classification
- Domain: Eukaryota
- Kingdom: Animalia
- Phylum: Arthropoda
- Class: Insecta
- Order: Coleoptera
- Suborder: Polyphaga
- Infraorder: Cucujiformia
- Family: Chrysomelidae
- Subfamily: Criocerinae
- Tribe: Lemini
- Genus: Oulema
- Species: O. arizonae

Binomial name
- Oulema arizonae (Schaeffer, 1919)

Species of beetle

Oulema arizonae is a species of leaf beetle in the family Chrysomelidae. It is found in North America.
