= Oulema palustris =

Scientific classification
- Kingdom: Animalia
- Phylum: Arthropoda
- Class: Insecta
- Order: Coleoptera
- Suborder: Polyphaga
- Infraorder: Cucujiformia
- Family: Chrysomelidae
- Subfamily: Criocerinae
- Tribe: Lemini
- Genus: Oulema
- Species: O. palustris

Binomial name
- Oulema palustris (Blatchley, 1913)

Species of beetle

Oulema palustris is a species of leaf beetle in the family Chrysomelidae. It is found in North America. Larvae are leaf miners of Cirsium horridulum and burrow in soil prior to pupation. Adults also feed on thistles.
