= Oulema dilutipes =

Scientific classification
- Kingdom: Animalia
- Phylum: Arthropoda
- Class: Insecta
- Order: Coleoptera
- Suborder: Polyphaga
- Infraorder: Cucujiformia
- Family: Chrysomelidae
- Subfamily: Criocerinae
- Tribe: Lemini
- Genus: Oulema
- Species: O. dilutipes

Binomial name
- Oulema dilutipes (Fairmaire, 1888)

Synonyms
- Lema dilutipes Fairmaire, 1888

Species of beetle

Oulema dilutipes is a species of leaf beetle in the family Chrysomelidae. It is found in Korea, China and Japan.

It was first described by Léon Fairmaire in 1888 as Lema dilutipes.
