= Oulema texana =

Scientific classification
- Domain: Eukaryota
- Kingdom: Animalia
- Phylum: Arthropoda
- Class: Insecta
- Order: Coleoptera
- Suborder: Polyphaga
- Infraorder: Cucujiformia
- Family: Chrysomelidae
- Subfamily: Criocerinae
- Tribe: Lemini
- Genus: Oulema
- Species: O. texana

Binomial name
- Oulema texana (Crotch, 1873)

Species of beetle

Oulema texana is a species of North American leaf beetle in the family Chrysomelidae.
