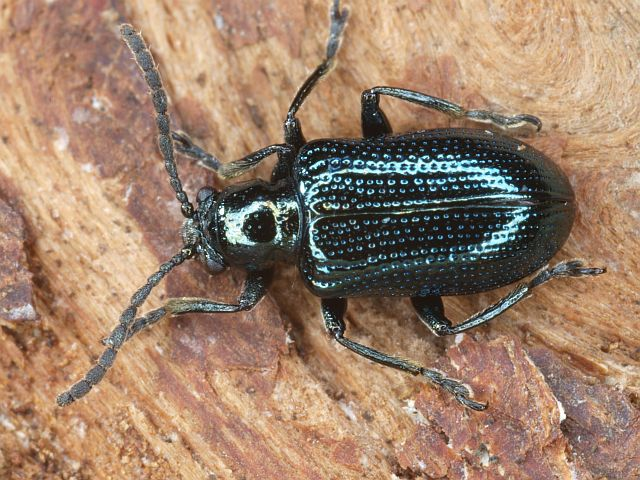
- Lema cyanella 4.0–5.5 mm

Scientific classification
- Kingdom: Animalia
- Phylum: Arthropoda
- Class: Insecta
- Order: Coleoptera
- Suborder: Polyphaga
- Infraorder: Cucujiformia
- Family: Chrysomelidae
- Subfamily: Criocerinae
- Tribe: Lemini
- Genus: Lema
- Species: L. cyanella

Binomial name
- Lema cyanella (Linnaeus, 1758)

= Lema cyanella =

Species of beetle

Lema cyanella, known as the californian thistle leaf beetle, is a species of beetle in family Chrysomelidae.

== Distribution ==
Lema cyanella is found in the Palearctic, and also in spots in Asia and Oceania. It is found in: Spain, France, the United Kingdom, Germany, Italy, the Czech Republic, Austria, Hungary, Serbia, Bosnia and Herzegovina, Denmark, Norway, Finland, Russia, Lithuania, India, Taiwan, South Korea, China, and New Zealand (where it is not native).

Female lay an average of 1564 eggs with Circium arvense being the main host.

== Biological Control agent ==
It was thought it might be a useful biological agent to control Circium arvense, a significant weed of wheatfields, which damages their productivity. Given that the main host of Lema cyanella was Circium arvense and the evidence that no plants of economic importance were attacked, it was believed it mightbecome a useful biological control agent.

=== In New Zealand ===
Lema cyanella was imported into New Zealand in 1981 as a biological control agent, with parasite-free progeny being released in 1983 but failing to prosper. In 1990 they were again iimported, with mass-rearing and distribution occurring in the 1990s. Despite again failing to prosper, they appear to have established themselves in New Zealand. This was similar to the Canadian experience.
