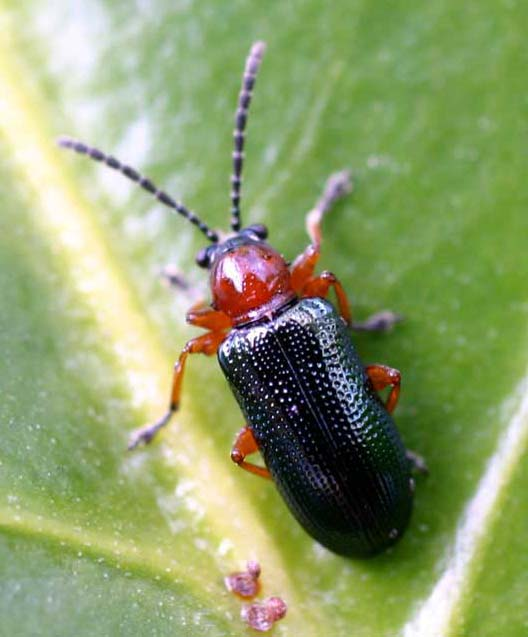
- Oulema melanopus

Scientific classification
- Domain: Eukaryota
- Kingdom: Animalia
- Phylum: Arthropoda
- Class: Insecta
- Order: Coleoptera
- Suborder: Polyphaga
- Infraorder: Cucujiformia
- Family: Chrysomelidae
- Subfamily: Criocerinae
- Tribe: Lemini
- Genus: Oulema; Des Gozis, 1886

= Oulema =

Genus of beetles

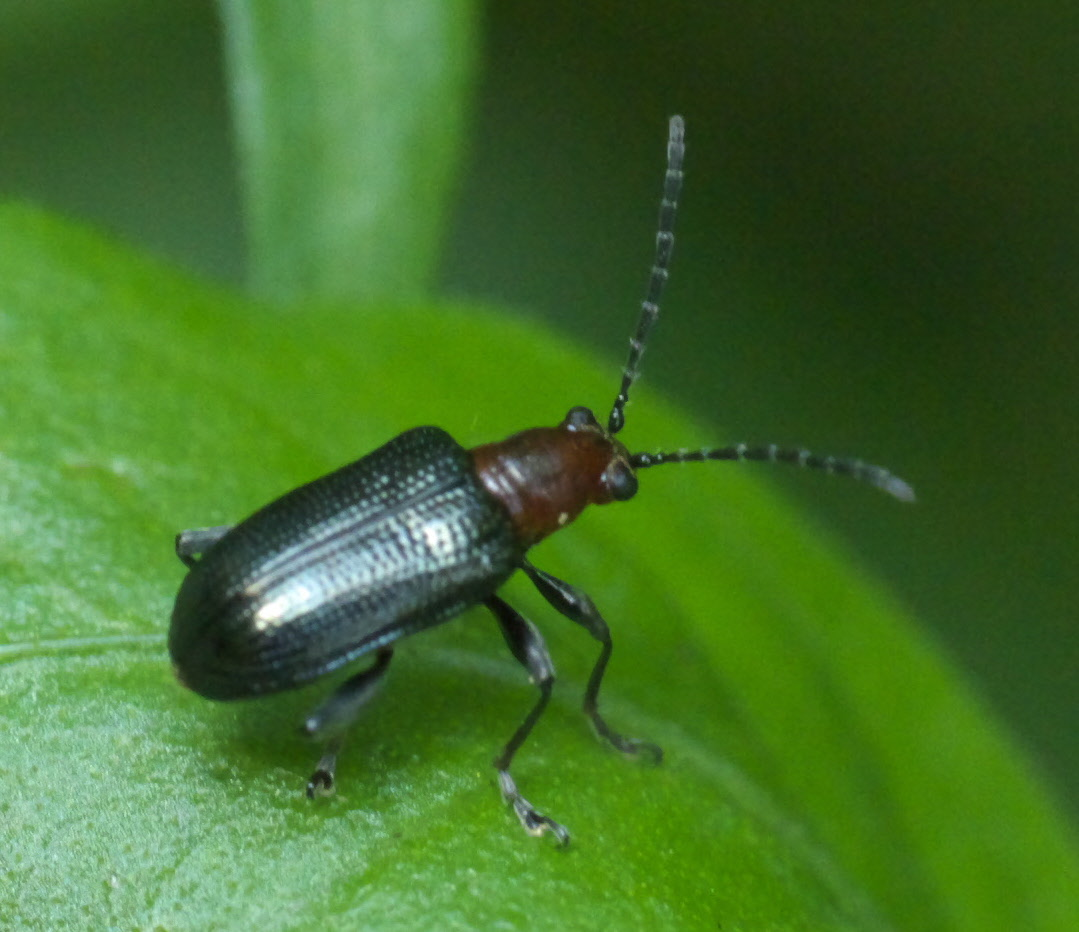

Oulema is a genus of leaf beetles in the family Chrysomelidae.

== Species ==
These 30 species belong to the genus Oulema:

- Oulema arizonae (Schaeffer, 1919)^{i c g b}
- Oulema atrosuturalis (Pic, 1923)^{g}
- Oulema brunnicollis (Lacordaire, 1845)^{i c g}
- Oulema collaris (Say, 1824)^{i c g b}
- Oulema concolor (Le Conte, 1884)^{i c g b}
- Oulema cornuta (Fabricius, 1801)^{i c g b}
- Oulema dilutipes (Fairmaire, 1885)^{g}
- Oulema duftschmidi (Redtenbacher, 1874)^{g}
- Oulema elongata R. White, 1993^{i c g}
- Oulema erichsonii (Suffrian, 1841)^{g}
- Oulema gallaeciana (Heyden, 1870)^{g}
- Oulema hoffmannseggii (Lacordaire, 1845)^{g}
- Oulema laticollis R. White, 1993^{i c g}
- Oulema longipennis (Linell, 1897)^{i c g b}
- Oulema maculicollis (Lacordaire, 1845)^{i c g b}
- Oulema magistrettiorum (Ruffo, 1964)^{g}
- Oulema margineimpressa (Schaeffer, 1933)^{i c g b}
- Oulema melanopus (Linnaeus, 1758)^{i c g b} (cereal leaf beetle)
- Oulema minuta R. White, 1993^{i c g}
- Oulema obscura (Stephens, 1831)^{g}
- Oulema oryzae (Kuwayama, 1931)^{g}
- Oulema palustris (Blatchley, 1913)^{i c g b}
- Oulema rufocyanea (Suffrian, 1847)^{g}
- Oulema sayi (Crotch, 1873)^{i c g b}
- Oulema septentrionis (Weise, 1880)^{g}
- Oulema simulans (Schaeffer, 1933)^{i c g b}
- Oulema taophiloides Gómez-Zurita, 2011^{g}
- Oulema texana (Crotch, 1873)^{i c g b}
- Oulema tristis (Herbst, 1786)^{g}
- Oulema variabilis R. White, 1993^{i c g b}

Data sources: i = ITIS, c = Catalogue of Life, g = GBIF, b = Bugguide.net
