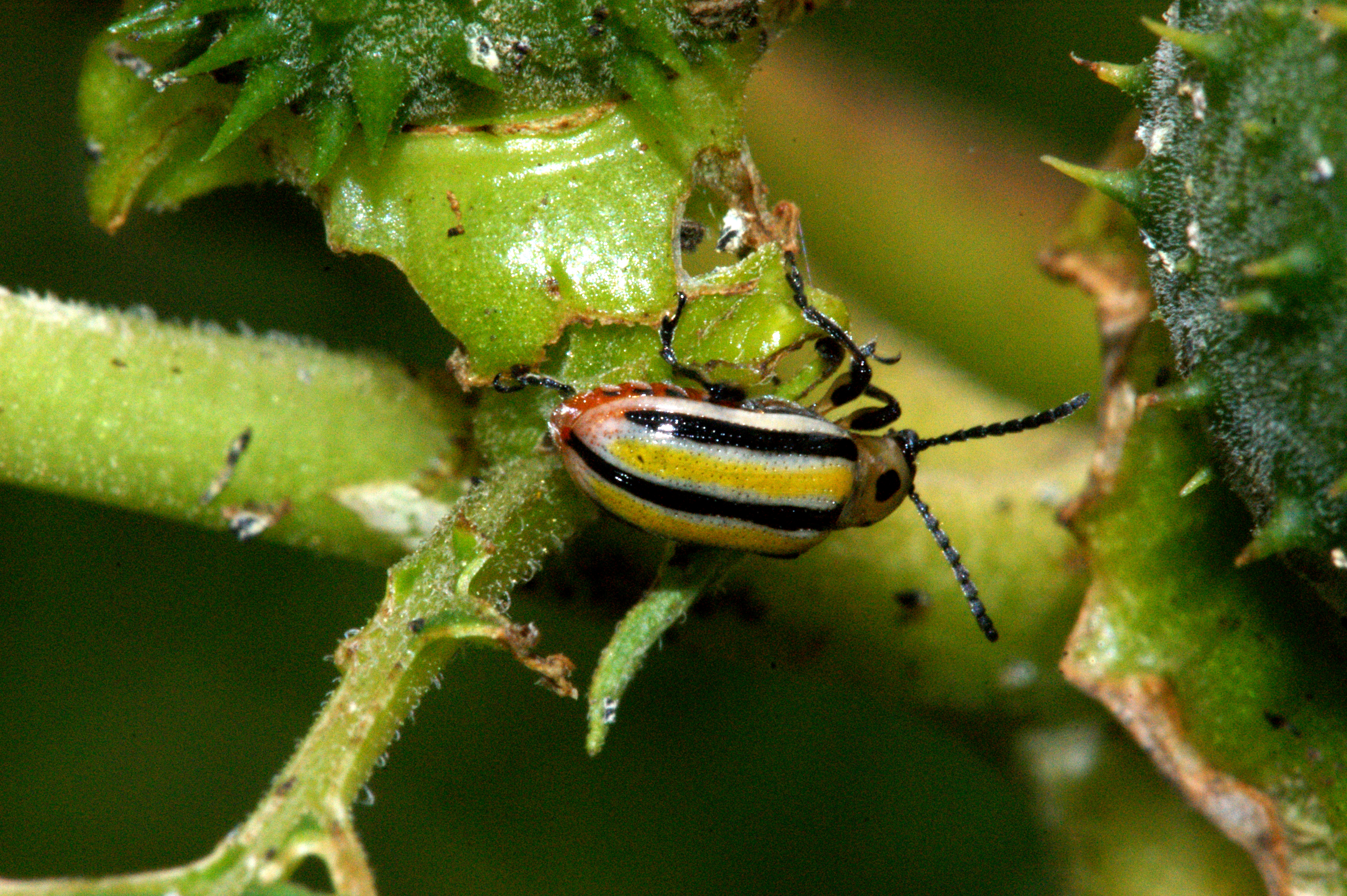
- Lema daturaphila

Scientific classification
- Kingdom: Animalia
- Phylum: Arthropoda
- Class: Insecta
- Order: Coleoptera
- Suborder: Polyphaga
- Infraorder: Cucujiformia
- Family: Chrysomelidae
- Subfamily: Criocerinae
- Tribe: Lemini
- Genus: Lema
- Species: L. daturaphila

Binomial name
- Lema daturaphila Kogan and Goeden, 1970

Synonyms
- Lema trilineata (Olivier, 1808); Crioceris trilineata Olivier, 1808

= Lema daturaphila =

Species of beetle

Lema daturaphila, commonly known as the three-lined potato beetle, is a species of beetle in the family Chrysomelidae. It is originally from Central and North America, but has spread elsewhere.

== Description ==
Adult L. daturaphila measure 7–8 mm in length and a bright orange-yellow in colour. Their elytra are marked with dark lines, one at either side and one along the suture between the wings. It is from this feature that their common name derives. The larvae are slug-like with black heads.

== Diet and behaviour ==
Three-lined potato beetles are found on plants in the family Solanaceae and are often agricultural pests to crops. They are commonly found on tomatillo (Physalis ixocarpa), which they can severely damage. They also feed on tomato and potato plants, but far less frequently. They can also infest sacred datura. The larvae hatch in late June or July, feed on their host plant, and are often found in groups. The larvae cover themselves with their own excrement, probably as a natural defence against predation.

== Similar species ==
L. daturaphila is similar in appearance to Lema trivittata and Lema bilineata, which are all closely related.
