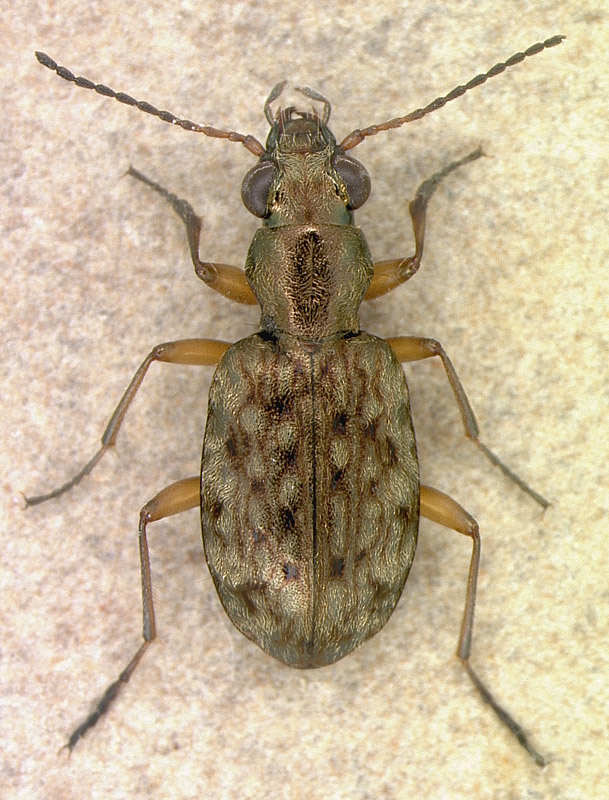
- Asaphidion alaskanum

Scientific classification
- Domain: Eukaryota
- Kingdom: Animalia
- Phylum: Arthropoda
- Class: Insecta
- Order: Coleoptera
- Suborder: Adephaga
- Family: Carabidae
- Subtribe: Bembidiina
- Genus: Asaphidion; Des Gozis, 1886

= Asaphidion =

Genus of beetles

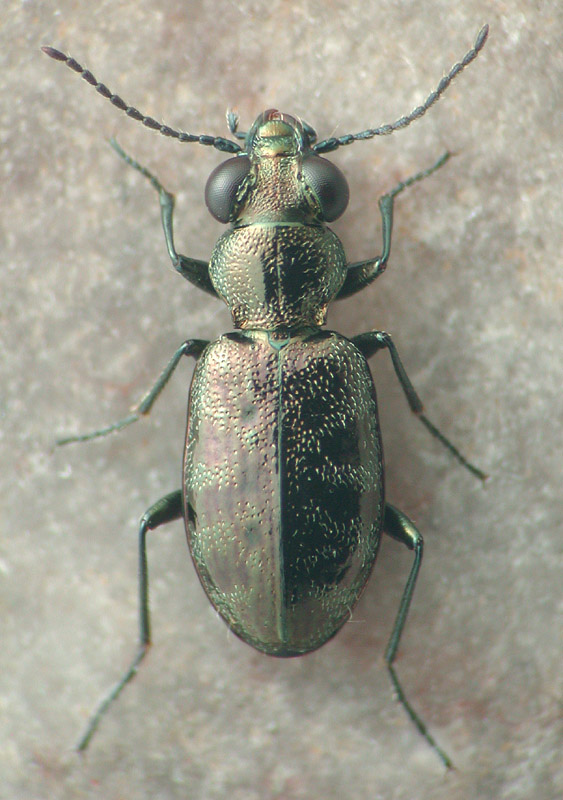
Asaphidion yukonense

Asaphidion is a Holarctic genus of ground beetle native to Europe, the Near East, North Africa, and North America.

These large-eyed, diurnal species are fast-running predators believed to be specialists on springtails and other tiny, soft-bodied prey.

== Distribution ==
Though predominantly a Palaearctic genus with one adventive exotic species in North America (A. curtum Heyden), there are two native North American species in the genus: A. alaskanum Wickham and A. yukonense Wickham. Both native taxa are Arctic in distribution, found mainly in tundra environments. The introduced A. curtum is now found in the northeastern United States and adjacent Canadian maritime provinces.

== Species ==
These 39 species belong to the genus Asaphidion:

- Asaphidion alaskanum Wickham, 1919 (the United States, Canada, and Alaska)
- Asaphidion angulicolle (A.Morawitz, 1862) (Japan and Russia)
- Asaphidion austriacum Schweiger, 1975 (worldwide)
- Asaphidion caraboides (Schrank, 1781) (Europe)
- Asaphidion championi Andrewes, 1924 (China, Pakistan, Nepal, Bhutan, and India)
- Asaphidion cuprascens Andrewes, 1925 (Nepal and India)
- Asaphidion cupreum Andrewes, 1925 (China and Russia)
- Asaphidion curtum (Heyden, 1870) (North America, Europe, and Africa)
- Asaphidion cyanicorne (Pandellé in Grenier, 1867) (worldwide)
- Asaphidion cyprium Maran, 1934 (Cyprus)
- Asaphidion domonense Minowa, 1932 (Taiwan)
- Asaphidion elongatum (Motschulsky, 1850)
- Asaphidion fabichi Maran, 1934 (Greece)
- Asaphidion festivum (Jacquelin du Val, 1851) (France and Italy)
- Asaphidion flavicorne (Solsky, 1874) (worldwide)
- Asaphidion flavipes (Linnaeus, 1760) (Europe & Northern Asia (excluding China), temperate Asia, and Africa)
- Asaphidion formosum Andrewes, 1935 (India)
- Asaphidion fragile Andrewes, 1925 (China)
- Asaphidion ganglbaueri G.Müller, 1921 (Turkey)
- Asaphidion granulatum Andrewes, 1925 (China)
- Asaphidion griseum Andrewes, 1925 (India)
- Asaphidion indicum (Chaudoir, 1850) (Pakistan, Nepal, and India)
- Asaphidion nadjae Hartmann, 2001 (Nepal)
- Asaphidion nebulosum (P.Rossi, 1792) (worldwide)
- Asaphidion obscurum Andrewes, 1925 (Nepal and India)
- Asaphidion ornatum Andrewes, 1925 (Nepal and India)
- Asaphidion pallipes (Duftschmid, 1812) (worldwide)
- Asaphidion pictum (Kolenati, 1845) (Georgia, Armenia, Azerbaijan, and Russia)
- Asaphidion rossii (Schaum, 1857) (worldwide)
- Asaphidion semilucidum (Motschulsky, 1862) (temperate Asia)
- Asaphidion stierlini (Heyden, 1880) (Europe and Africa)
- Asaphidion substriatum Andrewes, 1925 (Nepal, Bhutan, and India)
- Asaphidion subtile Breit, 1912 (Kazakhstan, Kyrgyzstan, and Tadzhikistan)
- Asaphidion tenryuense Habu, 1954 (Japan)
- Asaphidion transcaspicum (Semenov, 1889) (worldwide)
- Asaphidion triste Andrewes, 1935 (Nepal and India)
- Asaphidion ussuriense Jedlicka, 1965 (Russia)
- Asaphidion viride Andrewes, 1925 (India)
- Asaphidion yukonense Wickham, 1919 (North America)
