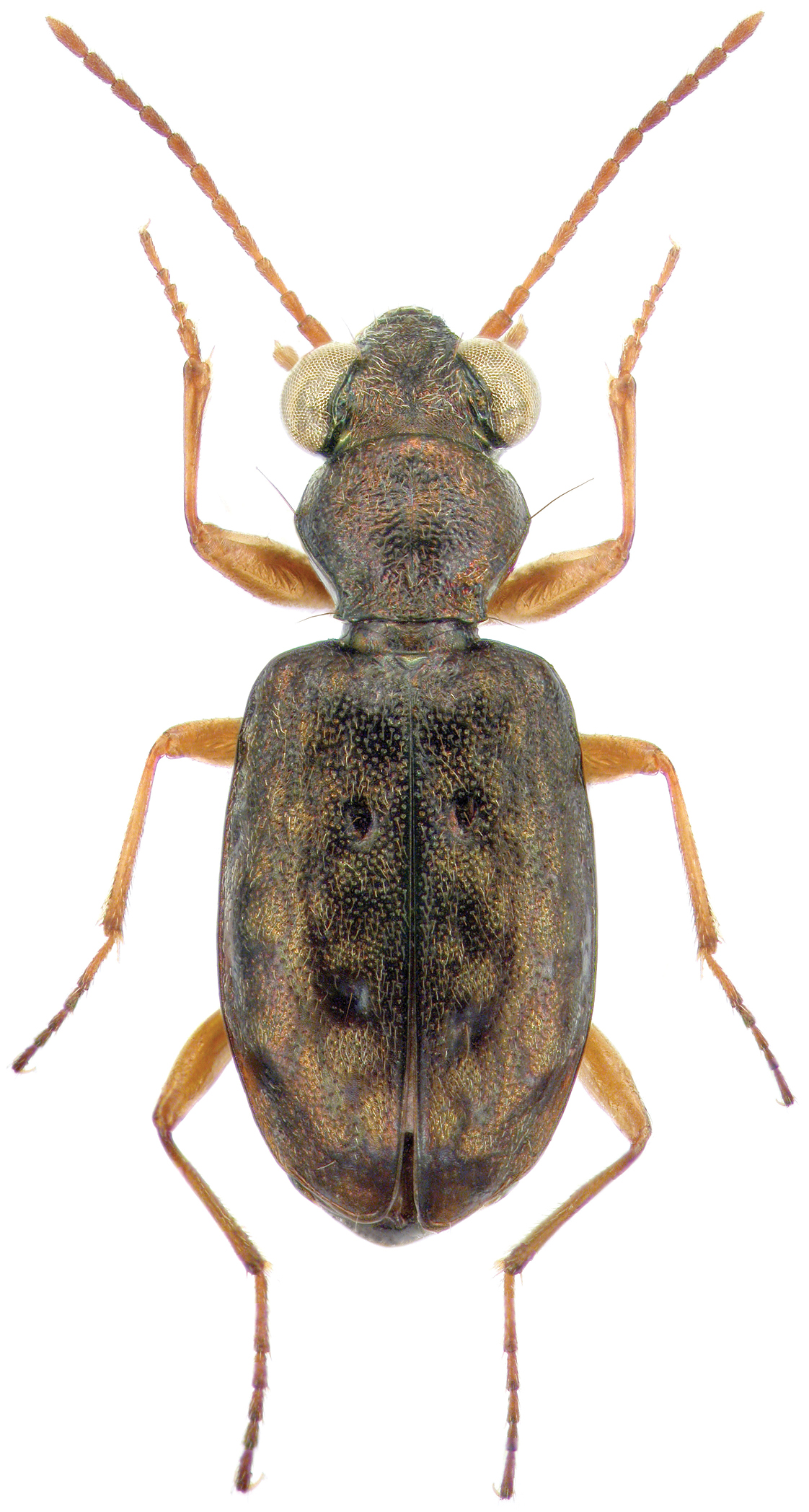
- Asaphidion curtum curtum (Heyden)

Scientific classification
- Kingdom: Animalia
- Phylum: Arthropoda
- Class: Insecta
- Order: Coleoptera
- Suborder: Adephaga
- Family: Carabidae
- Genus: Asaphidion
- Species: A. curtum

Binomial name
- Asaphidion curtum (Heyden, 1870)

= Asaphidion curtum =

Species of beetle

Asaphidion curtum is a species of ground beetle in the family Carabidae. It is found in North America, Europe, and Africa.

== Subspecies ==
These three subspecies belong to the species Asaphidion curtum:

- Asaphidion curtum curtum (Heyden, 1870)
- Asaphidion curtum delatorrei Uyttenboogaart, 1928
- Asaphidion curtum maroccanum Antoine, 1955
