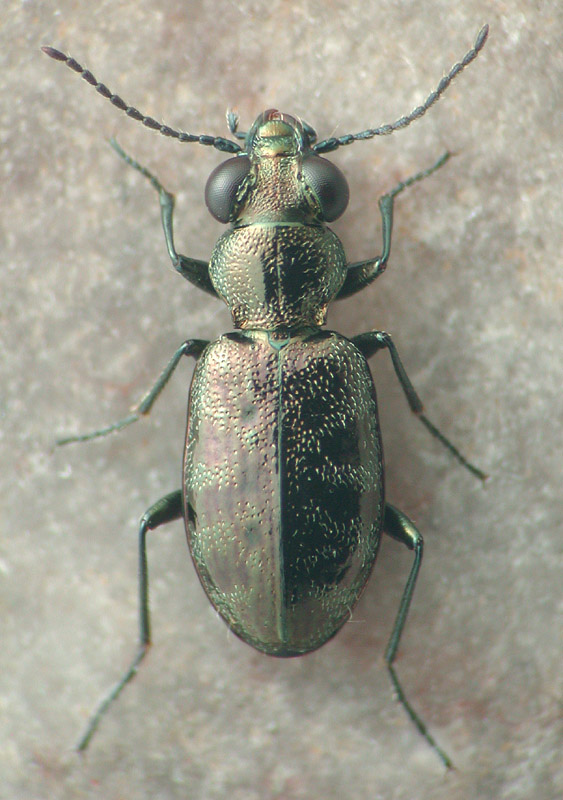

Scientific classification
- Domain: Eukaryota
- Kingdom: Animalia
- Phylum: Arthropoda
- Class: Insecta
- Order: Coleoptera
- Suborder: Adephaga
- Family: Carabidae
- Genus: Asaphidion
- Species: A. yukonense

Binomial name
- Asaphidion yukonense Wickham, 1919

= Asaphidion yukonense =

Species of beetle

Asaphidion yukonense is a species of ground beetle in the family Carabidae. It is found in North America.
