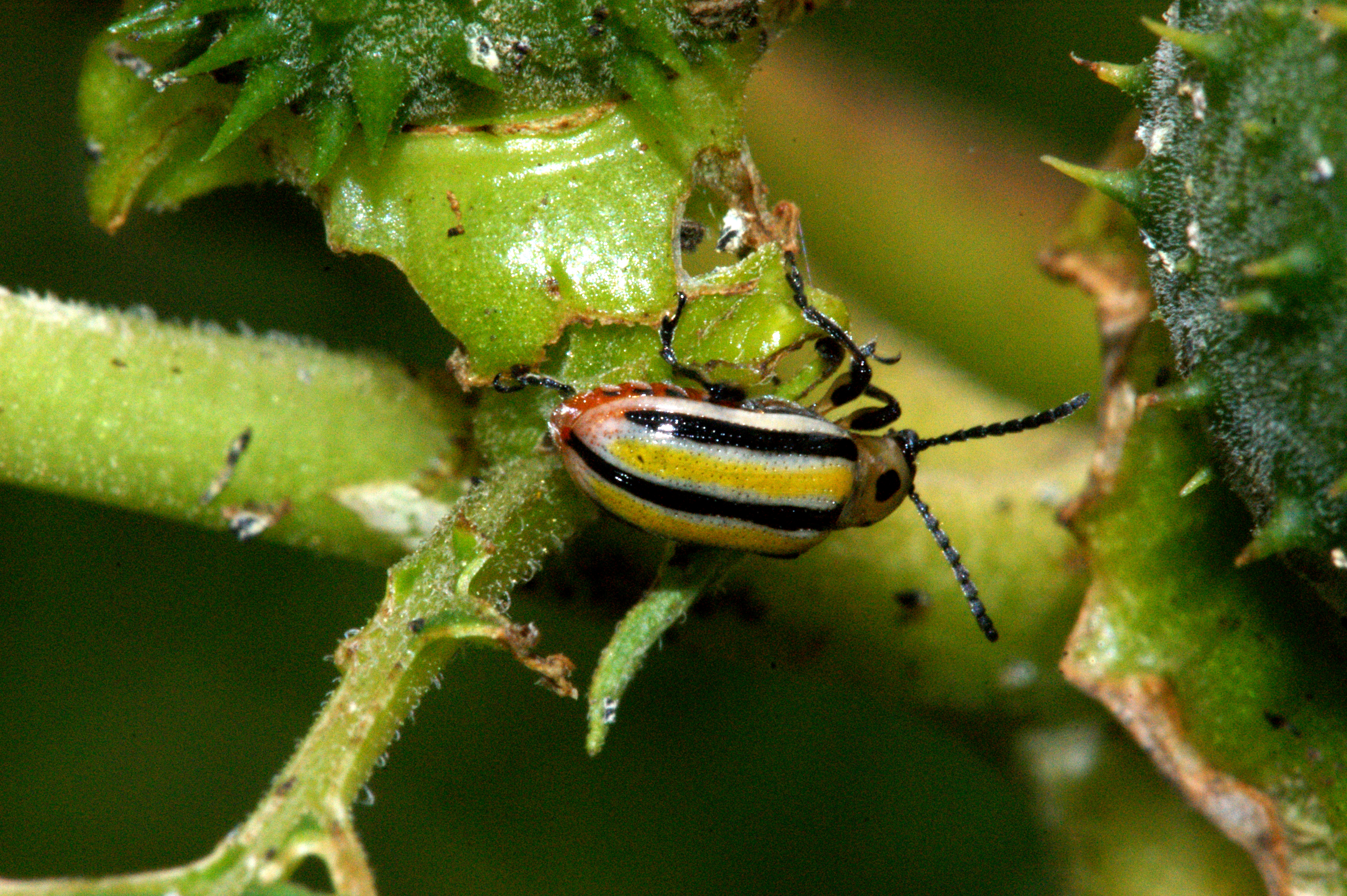
- Lema daturaphila

Scientific classification
- Domain: Eukaryota
- Kingdom: Animalia
- Phylum: Arthropoda
- Class: Insecta
- Order: Coleoptera
- Suborder: Polyphaga
- Infraorder: Cucujiformia
- Superfamily: Chrysomeloidea
- Family: Chrysomelidae
- Subfamily: Criocerinae
- Tribe: Lemini
- Genus: Lema; Fabricius, 1798

= Lema (beetle) =

Genus of beetles

Lema is a genus of beetles in the family Chrysomelidae.

== Selected species ==
Over 1300 species are in the genus Lema, organised into several subgenera:

Subgenus Lema Curtis, 1830

- Lema cirsicola Chûjô, 1959
- Lema concinnipennis Baly, 1865
- Lema coreensis Monrós, 1960
- Lema coronata Baly, 1873
- Lema cyanella Linnaeus, 1758
- Lema delicatula Baly, 1873
- Lema dilecta Baly, 1873
- Lema diversa Baly, 1873
- Lema externevittata Pic, 1943
- Lema fortunei Baly, 1859
- Lema praeusta (Fabricius, 1792)
- Lema puncticollis Curtis, 1830
- Lema scutellaris (Kraatz, 1879)

Subgenus Microlema Pic, 1932

- Lema decempunctata (Gebler, 1829)

Subgenus Petauristes Latreille, 1829

- Lema adamsii Baly, 1865
- Lema honorata Baly, 1873

Subgenus Quasilema Monrós, 1951

- Lema balteata LeConte, 1884
- Lema bilineata (Germar, 1823)
- Lema circumvittata Clark in Bates and Clark, 1866
- Lema confusa Chevrolat, 1835
- Lema conjuncta Lacordaire, 1845
- Lema daturaphila Kogan and Goeden, 1970
- Lema maderensis R. White, 1993
- Lema melanofrons R. White, 1993
- Lema nigrovittata (Sahlberg, 1878)
- Lema opulenta Harold in Gemminger & Harold, 1874
- Lema pubipes Clark in Bates and Clark, 1866
- Lema solani Fabricius, 1798
- Lema trivittata Weber, 1909
