= Lema conjuncta =

Scientific classification
- Domain: Eukaryota
- Kingdom: Animalia
- Phylum: Arthropoda
- Class: Insecta
- Order: Coleoptera
- Suborder: Polyphaga
- Infraorder: Cucujiformia
- Family: Chrysomelidae
- Genus: Lema
- Species: L. conjuncta

Binomial name
- Lema conjuncta Lacordaire, 1845

Species of beetle

Lema conjuncta is a species of leaf beetle in the family Chrysomelidae. It is found in North America.
