= Lema balteata =

Scientific classification
- Kingdom: Animalia
- Phylum: Arthropoda
- Class: Insecta
- Order: Coleoptera
- Suborder: Polyphaga
- Infraorder: Cucujiformia
- Family: Chrysomelidae
- Genus: Lema
- Species: L. balteata

Binomial name
- Lema balteata LeConte, 1884

Species of beetle

Lema balteata is a species of leaf beetle in the family Chrysomelidae. It is found in Central and North America.
