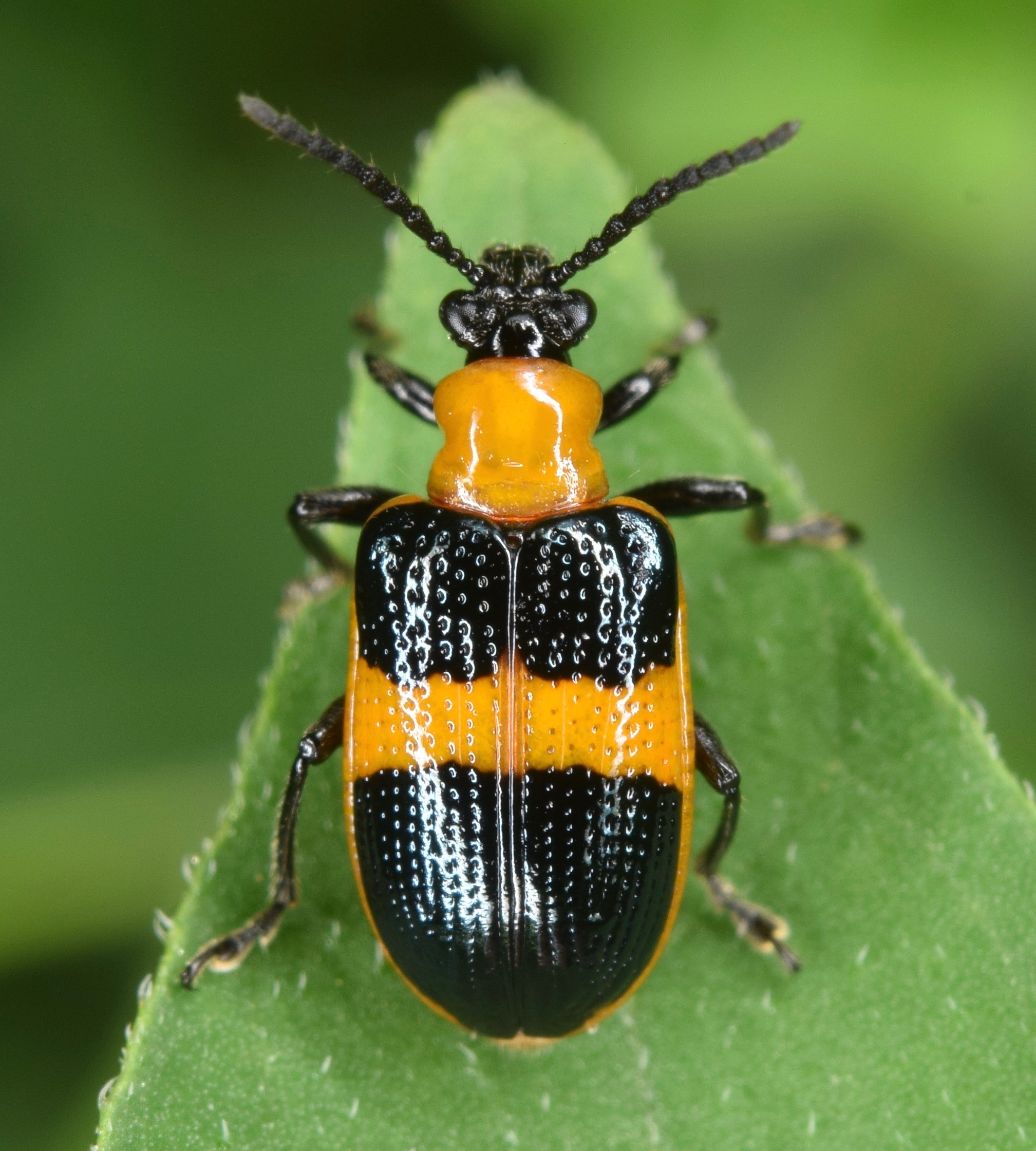
- Lema solani, Georgia, United States

Scientific classification
- Kingdom: Animalia
- Phylum: Arthropoda
- Clade: Pancrustacea
- Class: Insecta
- Order: Coleoptera
- Suborder: Polyphaga
- Infraorder: Cucujiformia
- Family: Chrysomelidae
- Genus: Lema
- Species: L. solani

Binomial name
- Lema solani Fabricius, 1798

= Lema solani =

Species of beetle

Lema solani is a species of leaf beetle in the family Chrysomelidae. It is found in North America.
