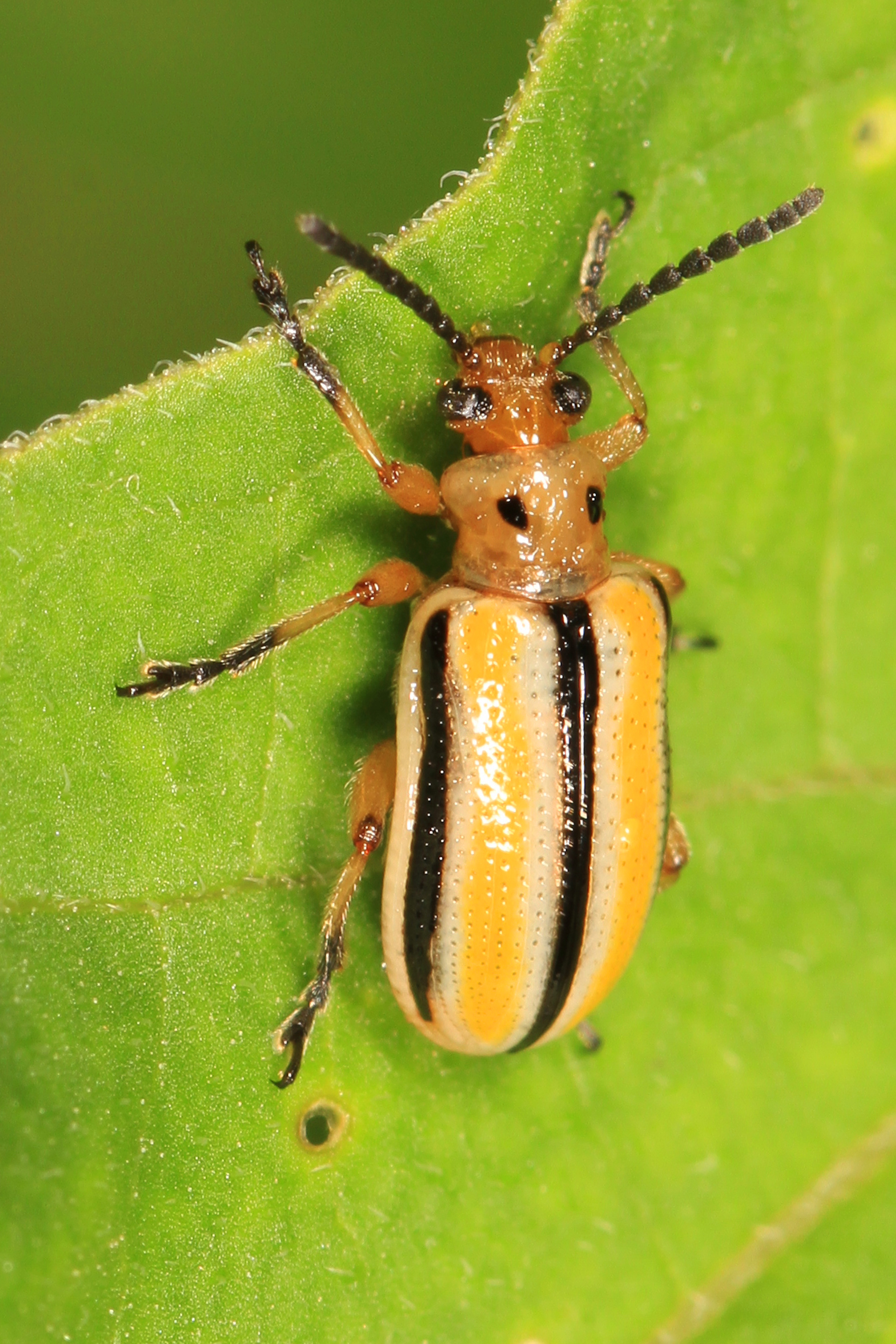

Scientific classification
- Domain: Eukaryota
- Kingdom: Animalia
- Phylum: Arthropoda
- Class: Insecta
- Order: Coleoptera
- Suborder: Polyphaga
- Infraorder: Cucujiformia
- Family: Chrysomelidae
- Genus: Lema
- Species: L. trivittata

Binomial name
- Lema trivittata Weber, 1909

= Lema trivittata =

Species of beetle

Lema trivittata, known generally as the three-lined lema beetle or three-lined potato beetle, is a species of leaf beetle in the family Chrysomelidae. It is found in Central America and North America. It is an introduced species in Australia

== Subspecies ==
These two subspecies belong to the species Lema trivittata:

- Lema trivittata medionota Schaeffer, 1933
- Lema trivittata trivittata Say, 1824

== Similar species ==
L. trivittata resembles and is closely related to Lema daturaphila and Lema bilineata.
