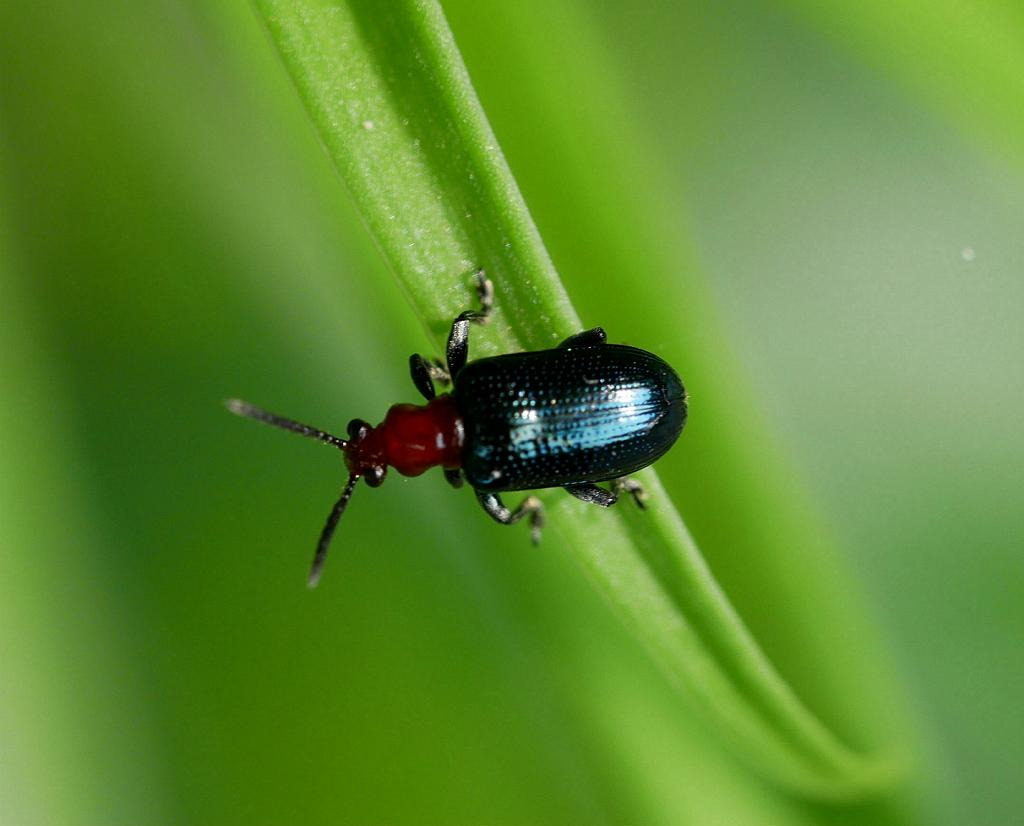

Scientific classification
- Kingdom: Animalia
- Phylum: Arthropoda
- Clade: Pancrustacea
- Class: Insecta
- Order: Coleoptera
- Suborder: Polyphaga
- Infraorder: Cucujiformia
- Family: Chrysomelidae
- Genus: Lema
- Subgenus: Petauristes
- Species: L. honorata

Binomial name
- Lema honorata Baly, 1873

Synonyms
- Cyrtonota honorata (Baly, 1869)

= Lema honorata =

Species of beetle

Lema honorata, common name yam beetle, is a species of beetle in family Chrysomelidae, and was first described in 1873 by Joseph Sugar Baly. The holotype was collected in Nagasaki from a Discorea plant.

The host plants on which both larvae and adults feed are members of the yam family. It is an agricultural pest in Japan.

== Distribution ==
Lema honorata is found in South Korea (where it found in Gyeongbuk and Gyeongnam), and in Japan, China, Thailand, and Vietnam.
