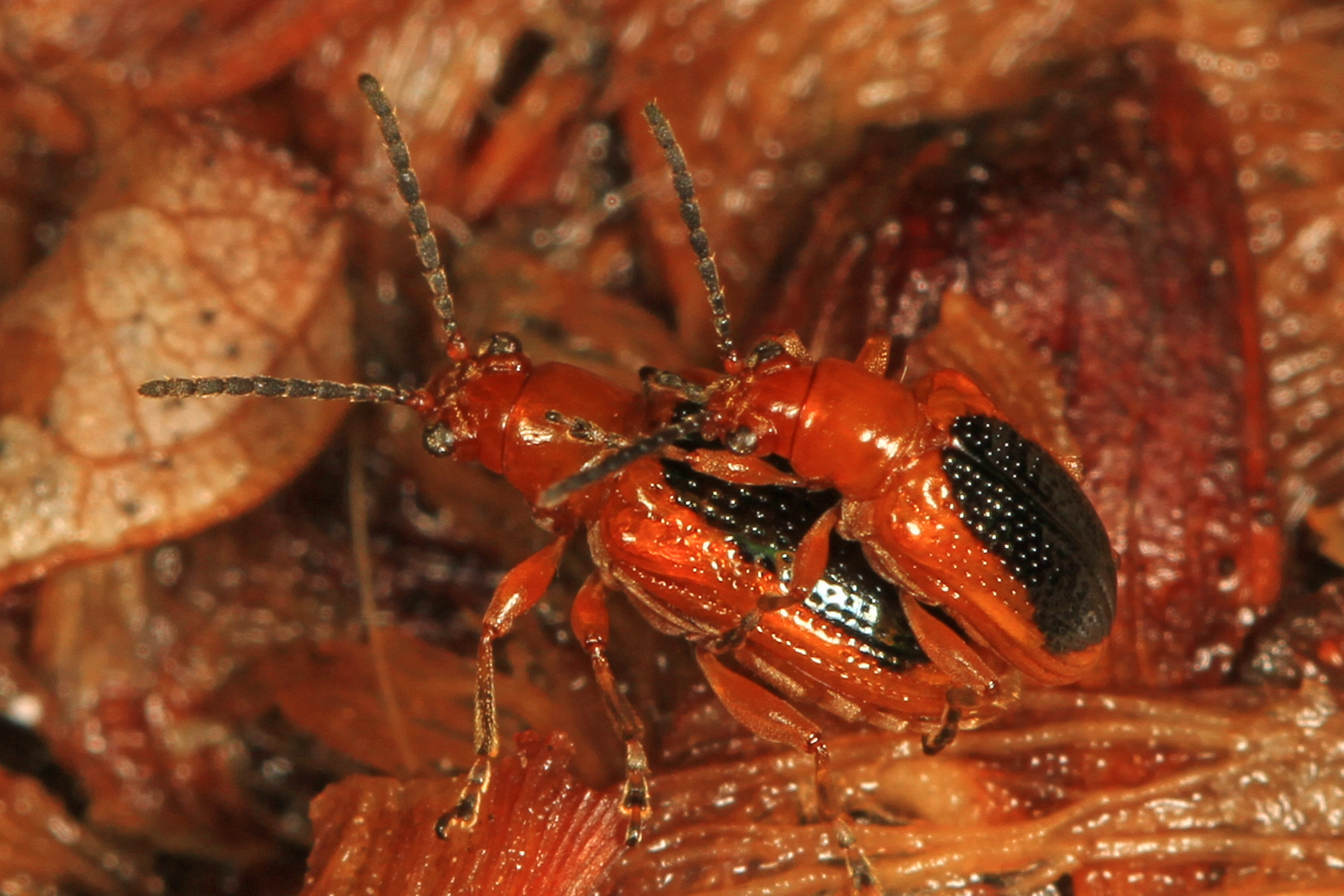
- Neolema ovalis

Scientific classification
- Domain: Eukaryota
- Kingdom: Animalia
- Phylum: Arthropoda
- Class: Insecta
- Order: Coleoptera
- Suborder: Polyphaga
- Infraorder: Cucujiformia
- Family: Chrysomelidae
- Subfamily: Criocerinae
- Tribe: Lemini
- Genus: Neolema; Monrós, 1951

= Neolema =

Genus of beetles

Neolema is a genus of leaf beetles in the family Chrysomelidae. Eight described species currently are placed in Neolema.

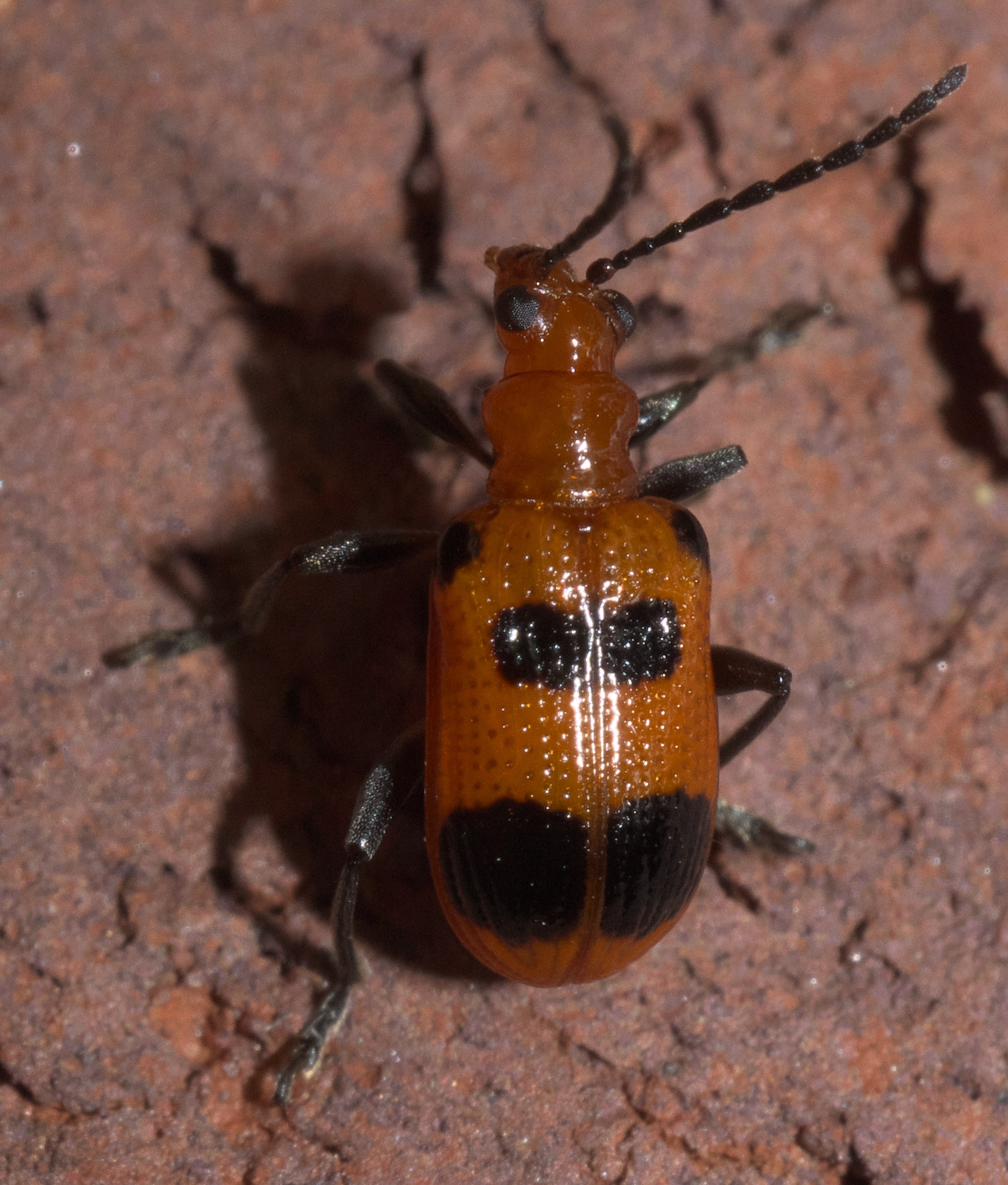
Neolema sexpunctata

== Species ==
- Neolema cordata R. White, 1993
- Neolema dorsalis (Olivier, 1791)
- Neolema ephippium (Lacordaire, 1845)
- Neolema gundlachiana (Suffrian, 1874)
- Neolema jacobina (Linell, 1897)
- Neolema ovalis R. White, 1993
- Neolema quadriguttata R. White, 1993
- Neolema sexpunctata (Olivier, 1808) (six-spotted neolema)
