= Maurice Gilbert Perrot des Gozis =

French entomologist (1851–1909)

Maurice Gilbert Perrot des Gozis (12 November 1851 – 11 April 1909, Montluçon) was a French entomologist who specialised in Coleoptera. His collections are held by Muséum national d'histoire naturelle in Paris.

== Works ==
- 1881: Quelques rectifications synonymiques touchant différents genres et espèces de Coléoptères français (1re partie). Bulletin Bimensuel de la Société entomologique de France, (1881)17(201): 150–151.
- 1882 Notes et remarques pour le futur catalogue des Coléoptères Gallo–Rhénane. Revue d‘Entomologie (Caen), 1, 193–207. (Pt)
- 1886. Recherche de l'espèce typique de quelques anciens genres. Rectifications synonymiques et notes diverses. Herbin, Montluçon. 36 pp.
