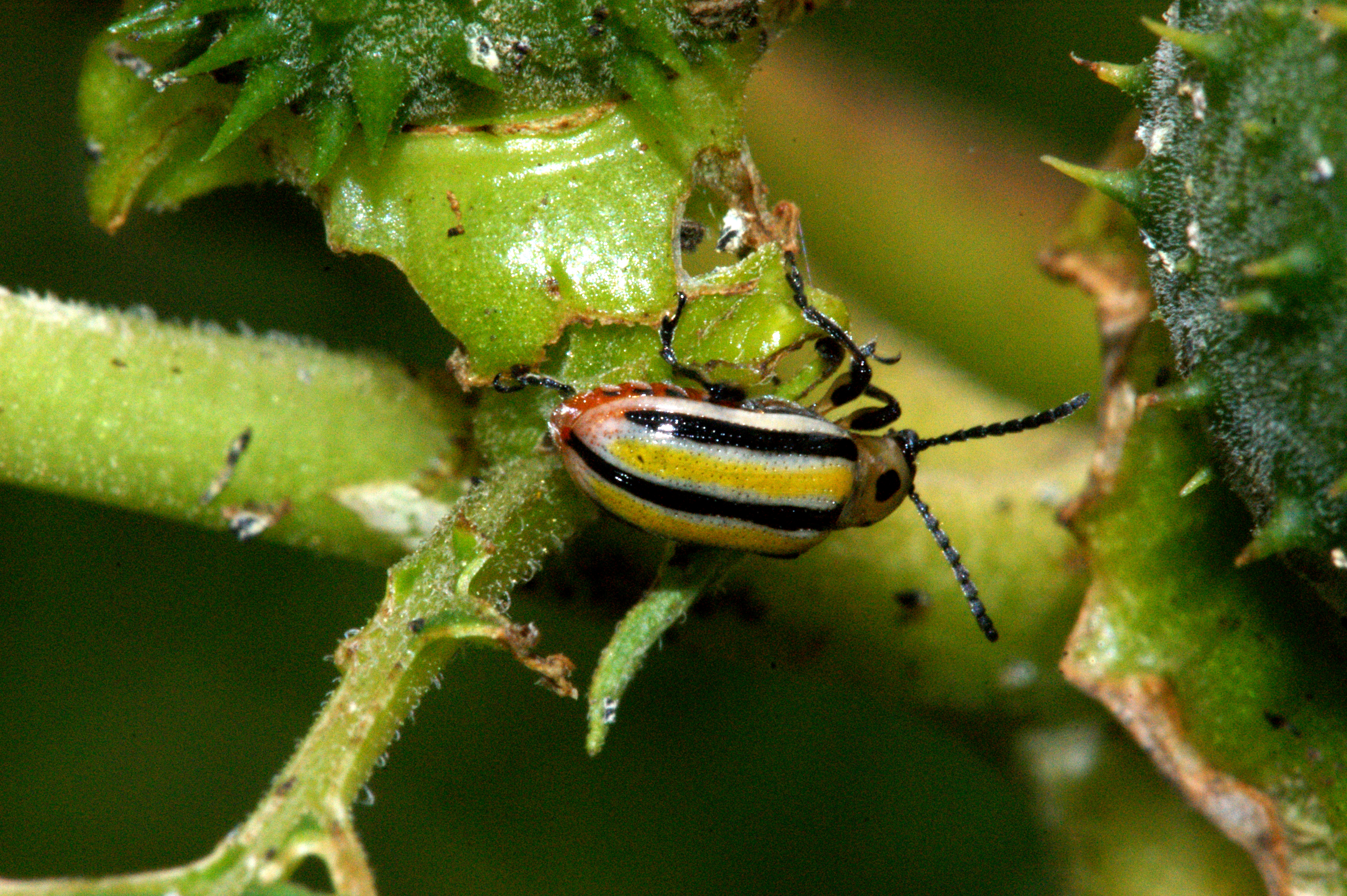
- Lema daturaphila

Scientific classification
- Kingdom: Animalia
- Phylum: Arthropoda
- Clade: Pancrustacea
- Class: Insecta
- Order: Coleoptera
- Suborder: Polyphaga
- Infraorder: Cucujiformia
- Superfamily: Chrysomeloidea
- Family: Chrysomelidae
- Subfamily: Criocerinae
- Tribe: Lemini; Heinze, 1962

= Lemini (tribe) =

Tribe of beetles

Lemini is a tribe of shining leaf beetles belonging to the family Chrysomelidae and subfamily Criocerinae.

== Genera ==
- Incisolema Pic, 1916
- Lema Fabricius, 1798
- Neolema Monrós, 1951
- Ortholema Heinze, 1943
- Oulema Des Gozis, 1886
- Plectonycha Lacordaire, 1845
- Stethopachys Baly, 1860
- Trichonotolema Heinze, 1927
