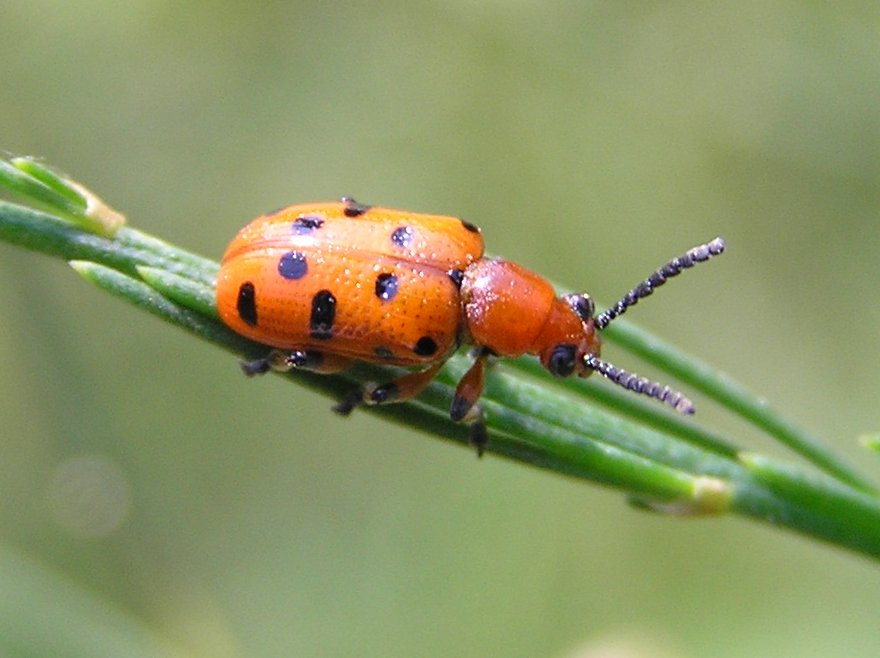
- Crioceris duodecimpunctata, the spotted asparagus beetle

Scientific classification
- Domain: Eukaryota
- Kingdom: Animalia
- Phylum: Arthropoda
- Class: Insecta
- Order: Coleoptera
- Suborder: Polyphaga
- Infraorder: Cucujiformia
- Superfamily: Chrysomeloidea
- Family: Chrysomelidae
- Subfamily: Criocerinae; Latreille, 1804

= Criocerinae =

Subfamily of beetles

The Criocerinae are a subfamily of the leaf beetles, or Chrysomelidae.

== Tribes and genera ==
- Tribe Criocerini Latreille, 1804
  - Crioceris Geoffroy, 1762
  - Lilioceris Reitter, 1912
- Tribe Lemini Heinze, 1962
  - Lema Fabricius, 1798
  - Neolema Monrós, 1951
  - Oulema Des Gozis, 1886

== Bibliography ==
- Schmitt, M (2010). "Criocerinae". In Löbl, Ivan; Smetana, Ales (eds.). Chrysomeloidea. Brill. pp. 359–368. ISBN 978-90-04-26091-7.
