= Lilioceris egena =

Scientific classification
- Kingdom: Animalia
- Phylum: Arthropoda
- Clade: Pancrustacea
- Class: Insecta
- Order: Coleoptera
- Suborder: Polyphaga
- Infraorder: Cucujiformia
- Family: Chrysomelidae
- Genus: Lilioceris
- Species: L. egena

Binomial name
- Lilioceris egena Wiese, 1922

Synonyms
- Lilioceris coomani (Pic, 1928); Homalispa egena Weise, 1921

Species of beetle

Lilioceris egena is a species of beetle belonging to the family Chrysomelidae, subfamily Criocerinae. The larvae feed on air potato (Dioscorea bulbifera) bulbils.

== Distribution ==
Lilioceris egena is native to Southeast Asia, and has been found in China (Anhui, Fujian, Hainan, Hong Kong, Sichuan, and Yunnan Provinces), India (Assam, Karnataka, and Uttarhand), Laos (Vientianne Province), Nepal, Vietnam (Tây Nihn and Ho Chi Minh Provinces), and Singapore.

== Description ==
Lilioceris egena has a reddish-brown or yellowish-brown body colour, a black or dark brown ventral surface. The base of the scutes has a few seta and the seta are sparse on the lateral sides of the metathoracic, abdominal and lateral plates. The prothorax is smooth, with a vertical row of stipples in the middle.

== Biological control ==
It is being released in Florida as a biological control for air potato vines. Females lay eggs on the air potatoes' tubers and the larvae feed on them.

== See also ==
- Lilioceris cheni, another species that feeds on air potato
- Scarlet lily beetle, a species that feeds on lily bulbs
