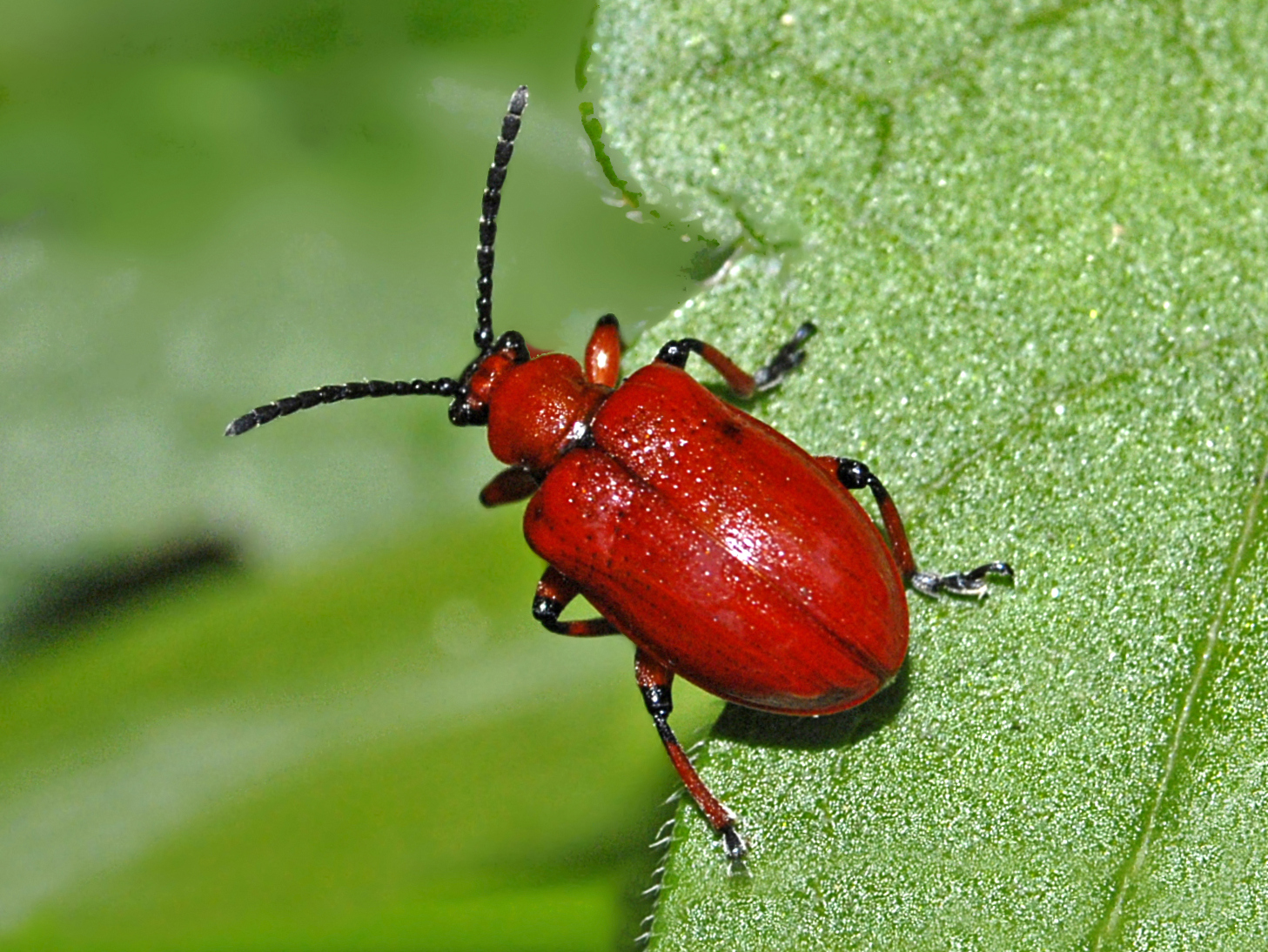
- Lilioceris merdigera. Upperside

Scientific classification
- Kingdom: Animalia
- Phylum: Arthropoda
- Class: Insecta
- Order: Coleoptera
- Suborder: Polyphaga
- Infraorder: Cucujiformia
- Family: Chrysomelidae
- Subfamily: Criocerinae
- Tribe: Criocerini
- Genus: Lilioceris
- Species: L. merdigera

Binomial name
- Lilioceris merdigera (Linnaeus, 1758)

Synonyms
- List: Chrysomela merdigera (Linnaeus, 1758); Crioceris brunnea (Fabricius, 1792); Crioceris merdigera (Linnaeus, 1758)

= Lilioceris merdigera =

Species of beetle

Lilioceris merdigera, the Onion beetle, is a species of beetle belonging to the family Chrysomelidae, subfamily Criocerinae.

== Distribution ==
This species can be found in most Europe (especially in Czech Republic, France, Germany, Italy, Luxembourg, Russia, and Slovakia) and in the eastern Palearctic realm (China, Japan, and Taiwan). It has been introduced also in Brazil and Mexico.

== Habitat ==
These shining leaf beetles inhabit edges of forests, fields and gardens.

== Description ==
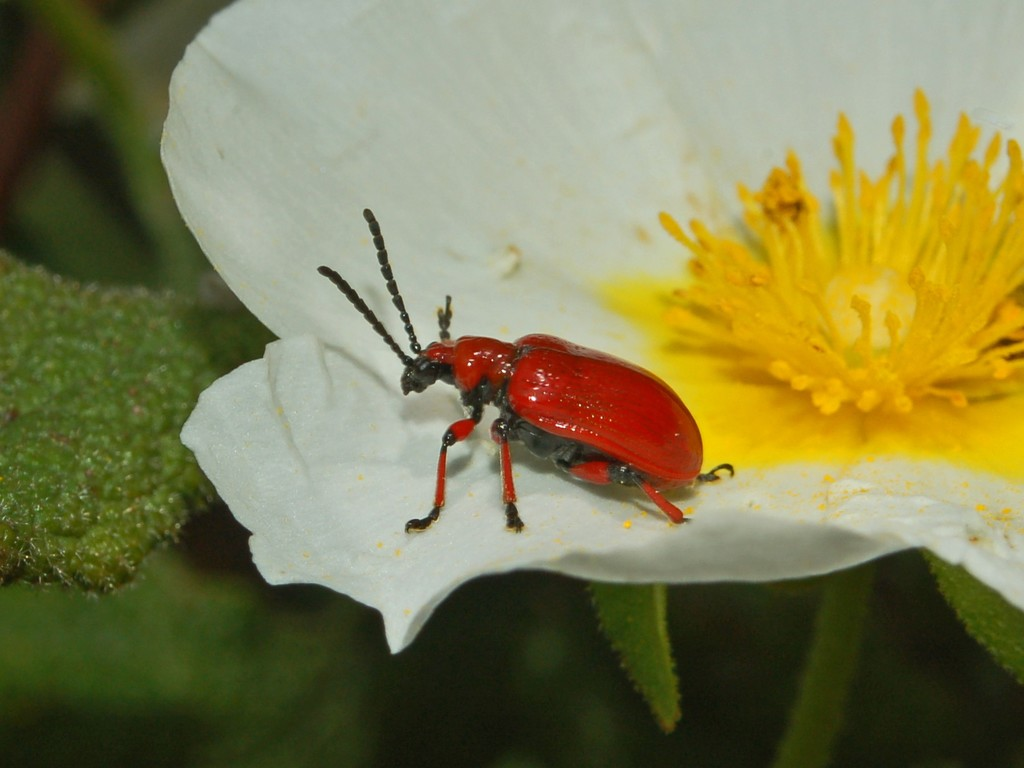
L. merdigera – Lateral view

Lilioceris merdigera can reach a length of 6–8 mm. Head, pronotum, elytra, femora and tibiae are bright red and elytra bear several rows of dots. It can be easily distinguished by the similar Lilioceris lilii which has black instead of red legs and head. This species is also similar to Lilioceris schneideri.

== Biology ==
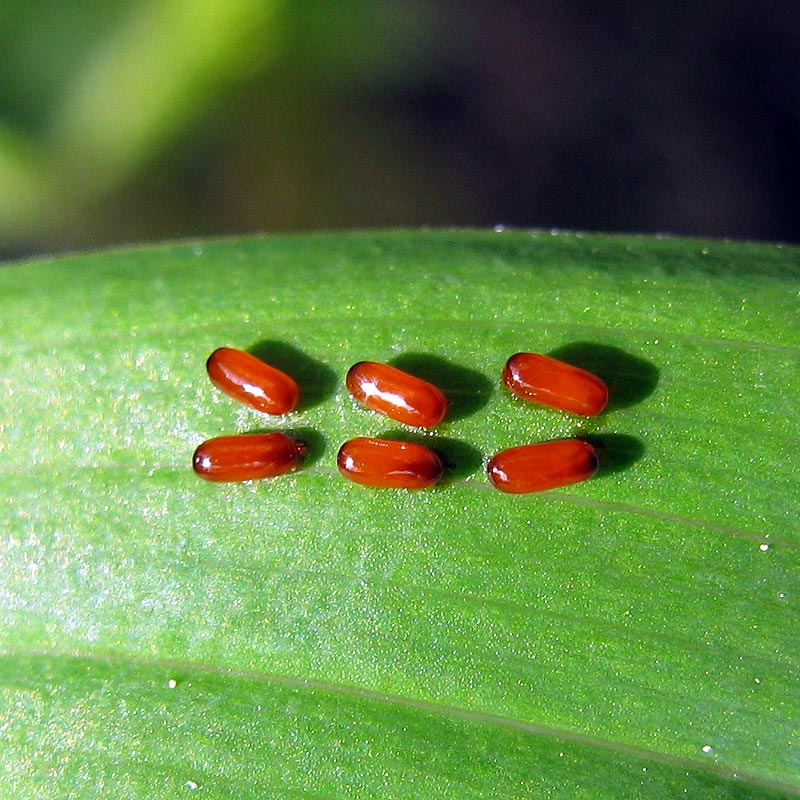
Eggs laid in two rows

The larvae are typically covered by blackish mucilaginous substances mixed with their own faeces, that seem to have a protective function. The specific epithet merdigera derives from its habit, from Latin merda (dung) and gero (to carry). The adult beetles can produce chirping sounds through their stridulation apparatus on the anal segment.

Adults overwinter in the soil. They emerge in April and May and can be seen until September. After mating, the females lay their yellow to brownish eggs on the underside of leaves of the host plants in rows with about six eggs. Eggs hatch into larvae in one-two weeks. After a month the larvae pupate in the soil. In about 20 days the adults emerge.

Both the adults and the larvae feed on the leaves, buds, stems and flowers of several plants, mainly Liliaceae, Alliaceae and Asparagaceae species, for instance Turk's cap lily (Lilium martagon), onion (Allium cepa), garlic (Allium sativum), Asparagus, Polygonum and Convallaria species. They can cause damages in case of heavy occurrence.

== Bibliography ==
- Georg Möller, Reiner Grube, Ekkehard Wachmann: Der Fauna Käferführer I - Käfer im und am Wald Fauna-Verlag, Nottuln 2006
- Jiři Zahradnik, Irmgard Jung, Dieter Jung et al.: Käfer Mittel- und Nordwesteuropas. Parey, Berlin 1985,
- Luczak, I. Noxiousness of onion beetle (Lilioceris merdigera L.) to onion (Allium cepa L.) [1992] Agricultural University, Krakow (Poland). Dept. of Plant Protection
- T Hayea, M Kenisa Biology of Lilioceris spp. (Coleoptera: Chrysomelidae) and their parasitoids in Europe Biological Control - volume 29, Issue 3, March 2004
