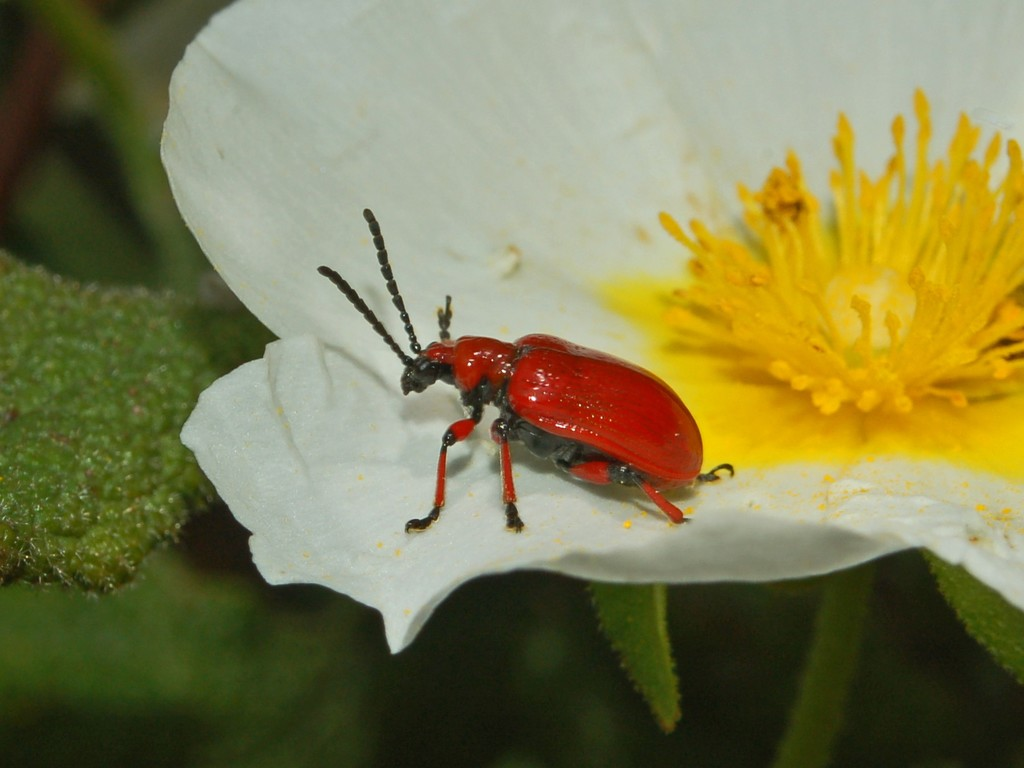
- Lilioceris merdigera

Scientific classification
- Kingdom: Animalia
- Phylum: Arthropoda
- Class: Insecta
- Order: Coleoptera
- Suborder: Polyphaga
- Infraorder: Cucujiformia
- Family: Chrysomelidae
- Subfamily: Criocerinae
- Tribe: Criocerini
- Genus: Lilioceris; Reitter, 1912

= Lilioceris =

Genus of beetles

Lilioceris is a genus of beetles in the leaf beetle family, Chrysomelidae. The genus was first scientifically described in 1912 by Edmund Reitter. Lilioceris belongs to the subfamily Criocerinae and tribe Criocerini (Latreille, 1807).

The family of beetles are of importance in horticulture because of their impact on the cultivation of lilies. Lilioceris cheni was introduced into Central Florida by biologists to try to control the spread of invasive air potato plants.

== Description ==
Species of Lilioceris are between 4 and 10 mm long. The body has a long narrow shape, with a pronounced shoulder between the elytra and pronotum. Both the larvae and the adult (imago) beetles feed on plants.

== Lifecycle ==
Lilioceris species are holometabolous, having a complete metamorphosis. The larvae proceed to a pupation stage to develop into adults.

== Diversity ==
Well over 100 species are described, with 80 in Asia alone.

Selected species:

- Lilioceris apicalis Yu in Yu, 1992
- Lilioceris brancuccii Medvedev, 1992
- Lilioceris cheni Gressit & Kimoto, 1961
- Lilioceris chodjaii Berti & Rapilly, 1976
- Lilioceris dentifemoralis Long, 1988
- Lilioceris egena Weise, 1922
- Lilioceris faldermanni (Guérin-Méneville, 1829)
- Lilioceris hitam Mohamedsaid, 1990
- Lilioceris jianfenglingensis Long, 1988
- Lilioceris keyiensis Medvedev, 2012
- Lilioceris kimotoi Mohamedsaid, 1991
- Lilioceris laetus Medvedev, 1992
- Lilioceris laysi Mohamedsaid, 2000
- Lilioceris lianzhouensis Long, 2000
- Lilioceris lilii (Scopoli, 1763)
- Lilioceris merdigera (Linnaeus, 1758)
- Lilioceris nepalensis Takizawa, 1989
- Lilioceris parallela Mohamedsaid, 1999
- Lilioceris rondoni Kimoto & Gressitt, 1979
- Lilioceris schneideri Weise, 1900
- Lilioceris thailandicus Medvedev, 2005
- Lilioceris tibialis (Villa, 1838)
- Lilioceris vietnamica Medvedev, 1985
- Lilioceris xinglongensis Long, 1988
- Lilioceris yuae Long, 2000

== Bibliography ==
- Schmitt, M (2010). "Liloceris". In Löbl, Ivan; Smetana, Ales (eds.). Chrysomeloidea. Brill. pp. 364–366. ISBN 978-90-04-26091-7.
