= Crioceris hampsoni =

Scientific classification
- Kingdom: Animalia
- Phylum: Arthropoda
- Clade: Pancrustacea
- Class: Insecta
- Order: Coleoptera
- Suborder: Polyphaga
- Infraorder: Cucujiformia
- Family: Chrysomelidae
- Genus: Crioceris
- Species: C. hampsoni

Binomial name
- Crioceris hampsoni Jacoby, 1908

Species of beetle

Crioceris hampsoni, is a species of leaf beetle found in India, and Sri Lanka.

== Description ==
Body yellowish with a length of 4.5 mm. Head and antennae are pitchy black. Elytra dull brick-red in color. There are three black spots on each elytron. Antennae short and robust. Thorax broader than long, with sub-cylindrical anterior portion. Pronotal disc is brick-red. Scutellum also brick-red, with piceous marginal lines. Elytra sub-cylindrical. Legs are brick-red.
