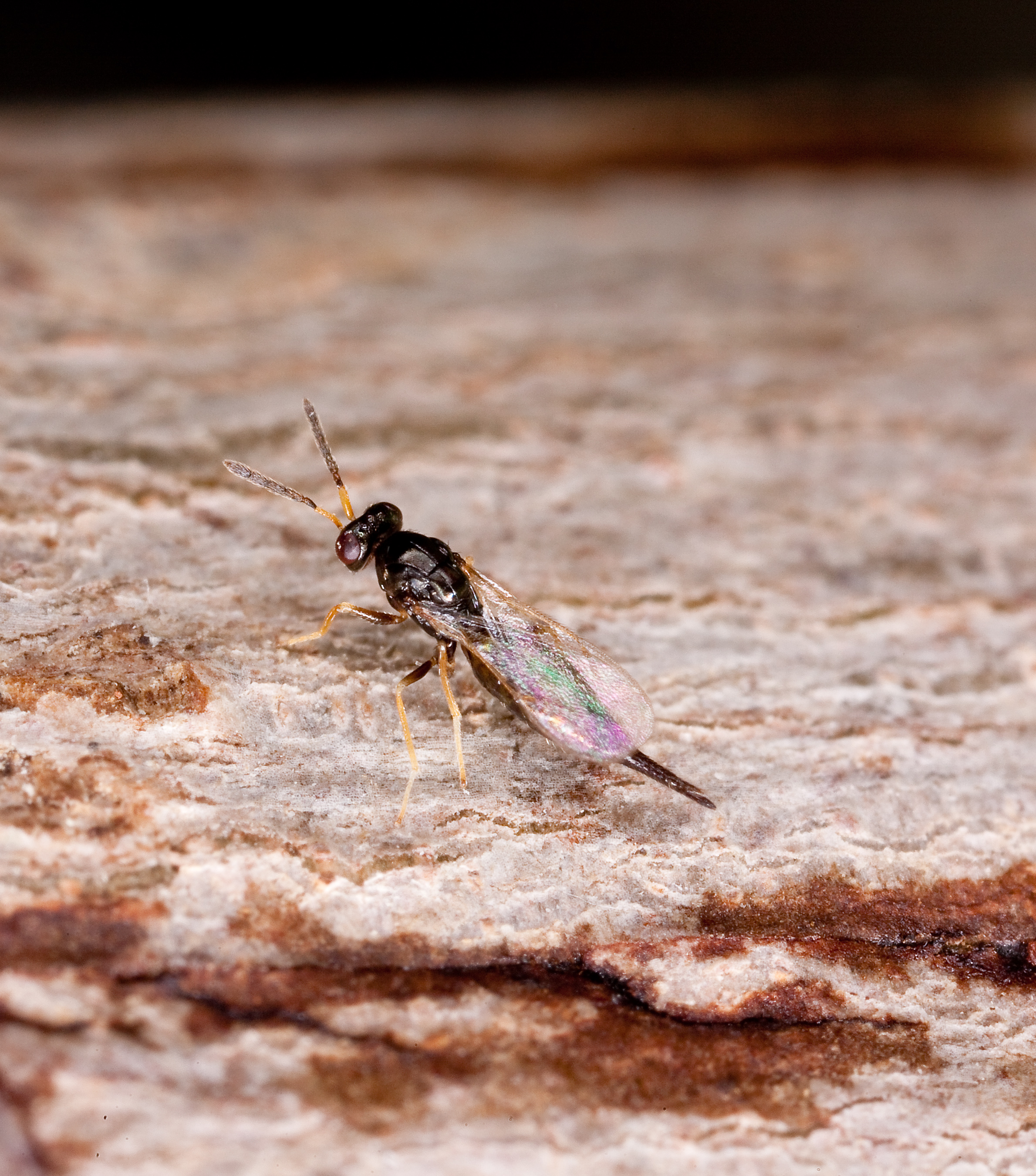
- Tetrastichus planipennisi

Scientific classification
- Kingdom: Animalia
- Phylum: Arthropoda
- Clade: Pancrustacea
- Class: Insecta
- Order: Hymenoptera
- Family: Eulophidae
- Subfamily: Tetrastichinae
- Genus: Tetrastichus; Haliday, 1844

Type species
- Tetrastichus miser, (originally designated as Cirrospilus attalus Walker, 1839) (Nees, 1834)

Species
- 450+ species

Synonyms
- Ceratoneuronomyia Girault, 1913; Ennetoma Dahlbom, 1857; Lygellus Giard, 1896; Neotetrastichus Perkins, 1912; Neparaprostocetus Mani, 1939; Pseudomphaloides Girault, 1915; Redinia Girault, 1936; Solenoderus Motschulsky, 1863

= Tetrastichus =

Genus of wasps

Tetrastichus is a genus of hymenopteran insects of the family Eulophidae.

Tetrastichus planipennisi is a parasitoid of the emerald ash borer, a wood boring insect native to Asia which is an invasive species in North America.

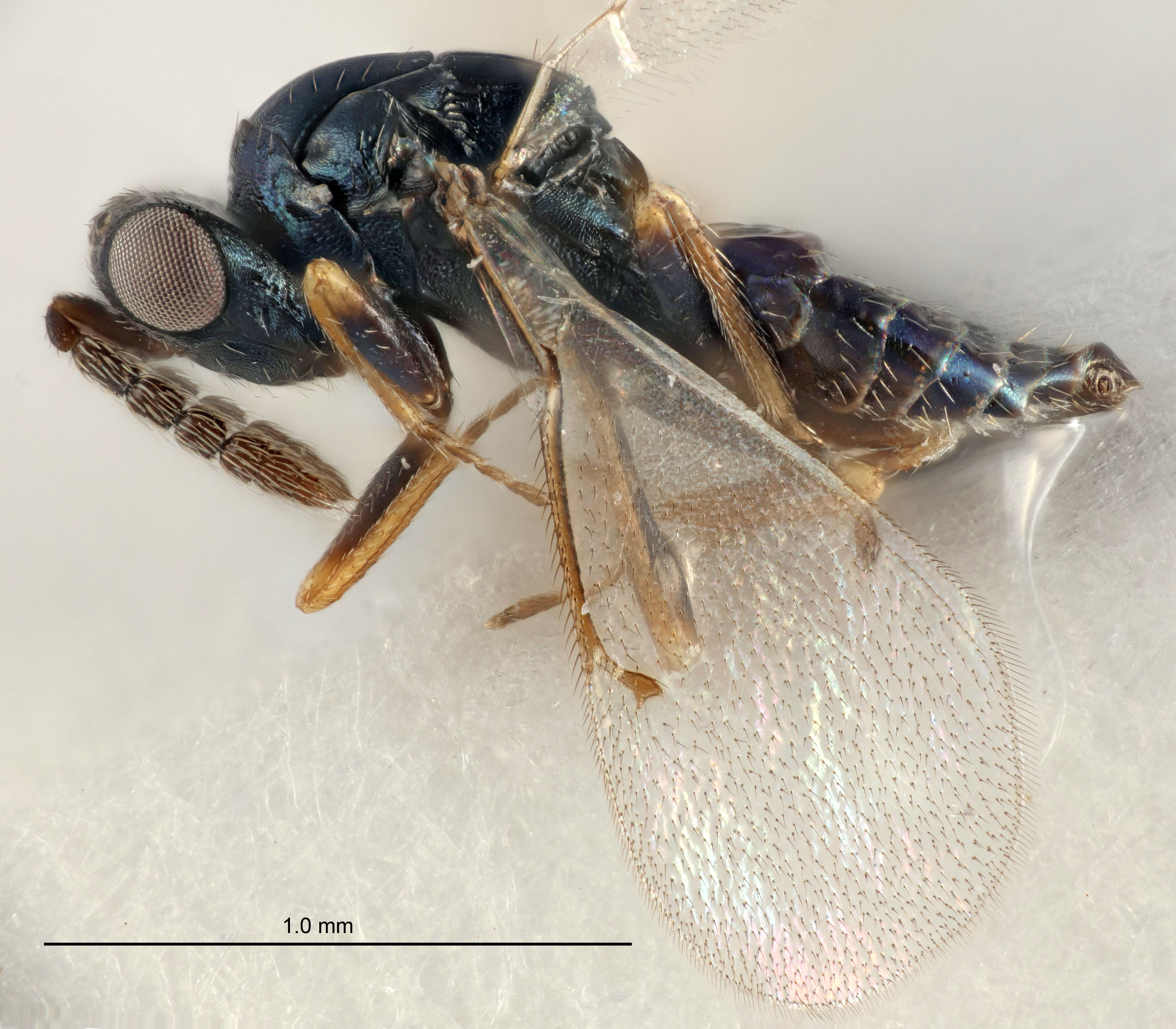
Tetrastichus setifer

Tetrastichus setifer is a paraditoid of the scarlet lily beetle. The beetle is invasive in North America, and highly destructive to lily species; the wasp has been introduced there for biological pest control.

Tetrastichus coeruleus can be used as a biological control agent for the common asparagus beetle.

== Host species ==
The genus Tetrastichus parasitizes many different species of Lepidoptera, such as Pyralis farinalis.
