= Dactylispa brevispinosa =

Scientific classification
- Kingdom: Animalia
- Phylum: Arthropoda
- Class: Insecta
- Order: Coleoptera
- Suborder: Polyphaga
- Infraorder: Cucujiformia
- Family: Chrysomelidae
- Genus: Dactylispa
- Species: D. brevispinosa

Binomial name
- Dactylispa brevispinosa (Chapuis, 1877)

Synonyms
- Hispa brevispinosa Chapuis, 1877; Dactylispa srnkae Weise, 1897; Dactylispa peregrina Maulik, 1919; Dactylispa brevispinosa yunnana Chen & Tan, 1961

Species of beetle

Dactylispa brevispinosa is a species of beetle of the family Chrysomelidae. It is found in Bangladesh, Bhutan, China (Yunnan, Xizang), India (Arunachal Pradesh, Assam, Himachal Pradesh, Meghalaya, Manipur, Punjab, Sikkim, Uttar Pradesh, West Bengal), Laos, Myanmar, Nepal, Pakistan, Thailand and Vietnam.

The recorded host plants for this species are Bambusa species and Dioscorea bulbifera.
