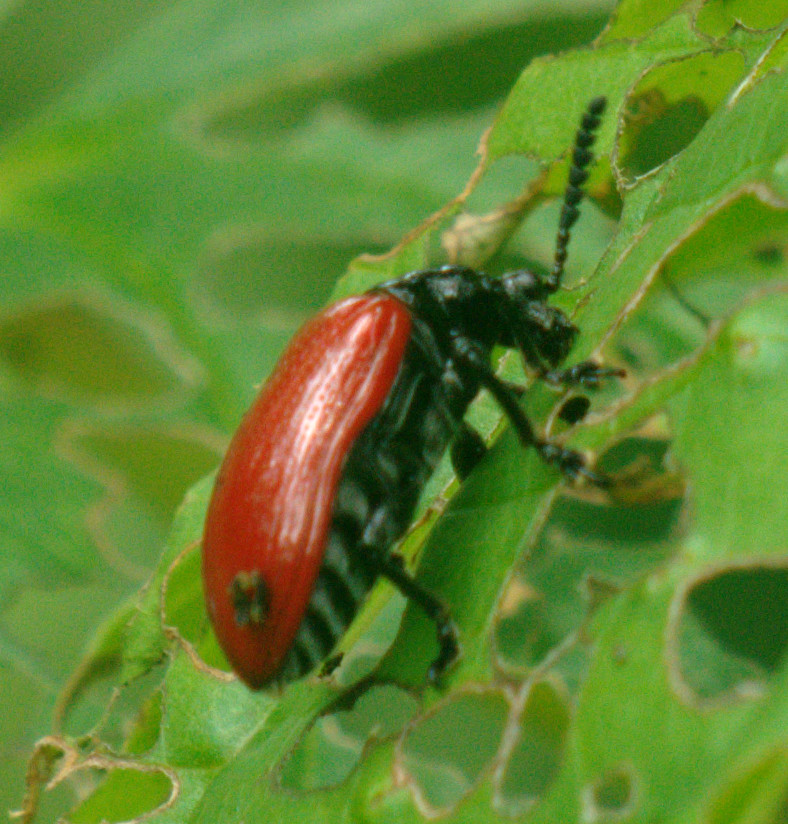
- Air potato leaf beetle on an air potato leaf

Scientific classification
- Domain: Eukaryota
- Kingdom: Animalia
- Phylum: Arthropoda
- Class: Insecta
- Order: Coleoptera
- Suborder: Polyphaga
- Infraorder: Cucujiformia
- Family: Chrysomelidae
- Subfamily: Criocerinae
- Tribe: Criocerini
- Genus: Lilioceris
- Species: L. cheni

Binomial name
- Lilioceris cheni Gressit & Kimoto, 1961

= Lilioceris cheni =

Species of beetle

Lilioceris cheni, the air potato leaf beetle, is a species of beetle in the genus Lilioceris that feeds on air potato plants. Air potatoes and the beetles are both native to Asia but have been introduced elsewhere. The air potato plants are an invasive species found throughout Florida, and the beetles were introduced in 2012 by biologists in Florida to help control the spread of the air potato.

== See also ==
- Lilioceris egena, another species being introduced in Florida from Nepal and China. The females lay eggs on the air potato tubers and the larvae feed on them
