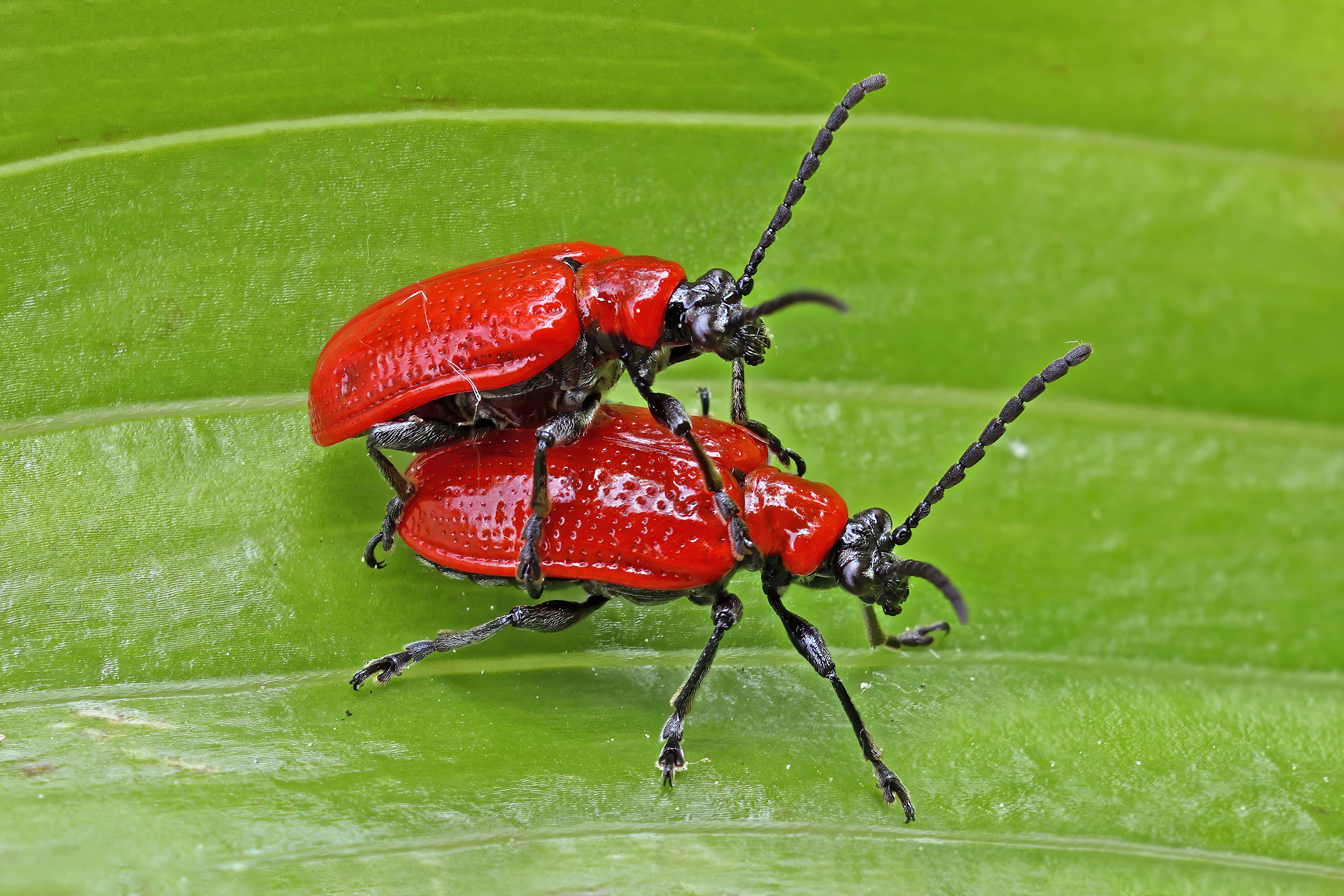
- Lily beetles mating, Oxfordshire, UK

Scientific classification
- Kingdom: Animalia
- Phylum: Arthropoda
- Clade: Pancrustacea
- Class: Insecta
- Order: Coleoptera
- Suborder: Polyphaga
- Infraorder: Cucujiformia
- Family: Chrysomelidae
- Subfamily: Criocerinae
- Tribe: Criocerini
- Genus: Lilioceris
- Species: L. lilii

Binomial name
- Lilioceris lilii (Scopoli, 1763)

= Scarlet lily beetle =

Species of beetle

The scarlet lily beetle, red lily beetle, or lily leaf beetle (Lilioceris lilii), is a leaf beetle that eats the leaves, stem, buds, and flowers, of lilies, fritillaries and other members of the family Liliaceae. It lays its eggs most often on Lilium and Fritillaria species. In the absence of Lilium and Fritillaria species, there are fewer eggs laid and the survival rate of eggs and larvae is reduced. It is now a pest in most temperate climates where it is not indigenous and lilies are cultivated.

== Description ==
The scarlet lily beetle belongs to the order Coleoptera, and the family Chrysomelidae, the leaf beetles. The adult lily beetle is about 6 to 9 mm (1/4 to 3/8 in) in length, with relatively long legs and antennae. Its elytra (harder forewings) are bright scarlet and shiny. Its underside, legs, eyes, antennae and head are all black. It has large eyes, a slim thorax, and a wide abdomen. Each antenna is made up of 11 segments. The eyes are notched and there are two grooves on the thorax.

The scarlet lily beetle may be confused with the cardinal beetle (Pyrochroa serraticornis), which also has red elytra and a black underside. The wing cases of the lily leaf beetle are dimpled and are shinier and more rounded than those of the cardinal beetle, which are relatively dull, and narrower, flatter, and more elongated. The cardinal beetle also has comb-like antennae. The lily leaf beetle is herbivorous, while the cardinal beetle preys on insects. The lily leaf beetle is also confused with unspotted ladybirds, but it is narrower in shape.

== Natural history ==
=== Distribution ===
The lily leaf beetle is indigenous to parts of Europe and Asia. It is thought to have been introduced to North America through the importation of plant bulbs in 1943. First spotted in Montreal, it spread throughout Canada and appeared in Massachusetts in 1992, and by 2012 was in all six New England States, as well as New York and Washington states. In Canada it is found from the Maritime Provinces west to Manitoba. As of 2001, it had spread as far west as Alberta, and as of 2017 full infestations had been reported as far north as the Edmonton, Alberta area. It has also become established as an invasive species in the United Kingdom since being first recorded in 1839, although the first colony did not become established until 1939 and it did not spread far until the 1980s, then more rapidly from the 1980s onwards. Since then it has spread from Surrey in southern England as far north as Inverness, Scotland. It is also found in Ireland, the Middle East and North Africa.

=== Life cycle ===
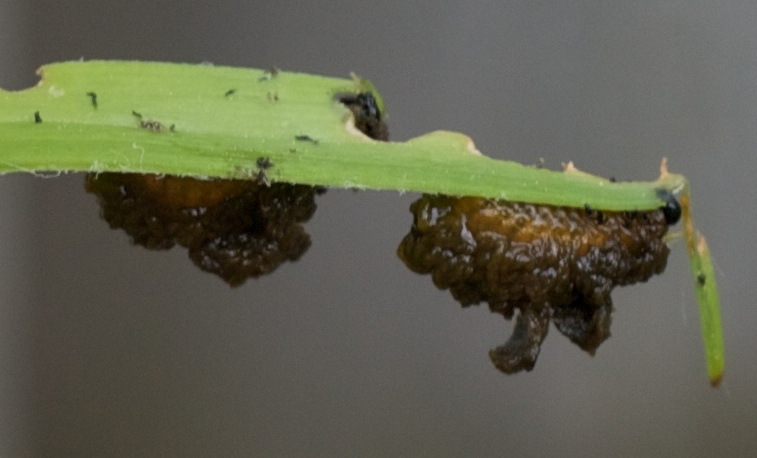
Larvae eating lily leaf

The beetle overwinters in the soil and emerges early in spring. The adult is generally found in moist, cool environments. It emerges in spring to feed and mate. The female can lay up to 450 eggs each season in batches of about 12 on the undersides of leaves. It arranges the red-orange to brown eggs in narrow irregular lines along the midrib, where they are more concealed. The eggs then hatch into yellow, brown or orange larvae in about 1–2 weeks.

The larvae feed for up to 24 days, beginning underneath the leaf then working up the rest of the plant, and cause the most damage. Their preferred feeding locale is underneath the leaf or at the node where the leaf meets the stem. They then burrow in the ground to pupate in a cocoon of soil bound with saliva. In about 20 days they emerge as adults and continue to feed until winter. More than one cycle can occur in one year.

=== Behaviour ===
Often the first evidence of lily leaf beetle infestation is sticky brown frass piles containing larvae on leaves. The larvae remain in the frass for protection from the sun and predators. However, the fecal shield is not effective protection against parasitoids, and it may actually make it easier for parasitoids such as the wasp Lemophagus pulcher to locate the larvae.

An adult that senses danger displays a defense mechanism, thanatosis, becoming motionless, folding up its appendages and falling with its black under surface facing up, thereby helping it camouflage with the ground to get away. If unable to escape, they are also able to 'squeak' by rubbing two parts of their body together, which may be used to startle the attacker. This process is known as stridulation and could even shock a bird or any other predator that may attack the lily leaf beetle.

Lilies may first show evidence of holes chewed in the leaves from consumption, and if left unchecked rapidly progress to blackening, and total loss of the leaves, leaving only the stem. Beetles and their larvae may also inhabit and devour the developing flower buds. Invasion may occur shortly after the new plants emerge from the soil, particularly if there are nearby Fritillaria which emerge earlier than Lilium. While Lilium and Fritillaria are affected, Hemerocallis is not. All types of lily may be affected, but while Asiatic lilies are the most vulnerable, some Oriental lilies may be more resistant. Resistant types include Lilium henryi 'Madame Butterfly', Lilium speciosum 'Uchida', and Lilium 'Black Beauty'. Other garden plants affected include Convallaria majalis, Polygonatum, potato (Solanum tuberosum), flowering tobacco (Nicotiana), hollyhock (Alcea) and Hosta.

== Pest impact ==
Adult eating lily leaf

Fritillaria and Lilium specimens in Canadian gardens, particularly around Halifax, Nova Scotia are significantly affected by the lily leaf beetle. A garden in Waverley, Nova Scotia has reported decline of lily species and cultivars from 50 in 1996 to only one in 2006.

=== Control ===
The most surefire strategy for preventing infestation by any pest is to avoid planting susceptible plants in the first place; with scarlet lily beetles, this necessitates avoiding growing so many desirable cultivars of Lilium that other strategies may be preferred. Regular handpicking and crushing of eggs, larvae and adults is effective, if somewhat laborious. Domestic insecticides registered for general leaf beetle control containing carbaryl, methoxychlor, malathion and rotenone can prove useful in controlling populations. However, malathion and carbaryl, effective on adults and larvae, are toxic to bees and other insects, respectively. Products based on neem extracts are useful in killing very young larvae and repelling adults without comparable harm to other insects, although this option is perhaps less effective than handpicking. Neem products should be applied every 5 to 7 days after egg hatch. Thiacloprid is also effective. Floating row cover has been effective in preventing the adults from feeding and laying eggs in the spring.

=== Biological control ===
In Europe, total parasitism rate in the last instar stage averages about 90% on wild Lilium martagon, 75% in gardens and 60% in cultivated lily fields. Most lily leaf beetle parasitoids are wasps that lay eggs inside the host and effectively kill all infected individuals. Diaparsis jucunda (Ichneumonidae: Tersilochinae), dominates over 90% of the parasitoid infections in lily leaf beetle. However, in gardens and commercial fields, Tetrastichus setifer (Eulophidae: Tetrastichinae) and Lemophagus pulcher (Eulophidae: Campopleginae) become the dominant parasitoids in the later season.

There are no natural predators or parasites of lily leaf beetle in North America. In 1996, University of Rhode Island began testing the effectiveness of biological control of lily leaf beetle using six natural parasitoids from Europe. CAB International Bioscience Switzerland Center has also participated in this project from 1998 till 2001. The European parasitoid wasp Tetrastichus setifer was used in Massachusetts from 1999 to 2001; the experiment showed reduction of the beetle population. Population decline was also observed at another experiment site in Rhode Island. In 2003, another parasitoid, Lemophagus errabundus, was released in Massachusetts and is now established in the region. Similar parasitoid releases have been made in Boston with positive results.

== Bibliography ==
- "Have You Seen the Red Lily Beetle?". Shand Greenhouse. 2008. Archived from the original on 2008-07-29.
