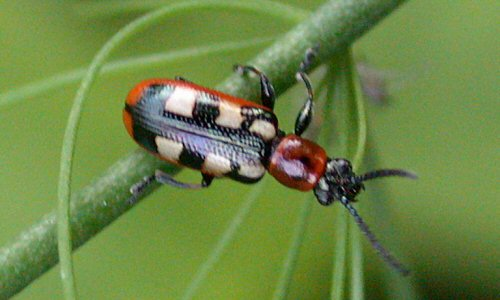

Scientific classification
- Kingdom: Animalia
- Phylum: Arthropoda
- Class: Insecta
- Order: Coleoptera
- Suborder: Polyphaga
- Infraorder: Cucujiformia
- Family: Chrysomelidae
- Genus: Crioceris
- Species: C. asparagi

Binomial name
- Crioceris asparagi (Linnaeus, 1758)

= Common asparagus beetle =

Species of beetle

The common asparagus beetle (Crioceris asparagi) is a major pest of asparagus crops both in Europe and in North America. Asparagus is its only food plant. The beetle is 6.0 mm to 9.5 mm long and slightly elongated. It is metallic blue-black in color with cream or yellow spots on its red-bordered elytra. The larvae are fat gray grubs with dark heads.

The adult beetles and the larvae strip the needle-like leaves off the asparagus fronds, depriving the plants of the ability to photosynthesize and store energy for future years. Additionally, they chew the spears and lay a lot of eggs on them, rendering the crop unusable. The larvae feed on the plants for a few weeks, then drop to the ground to pupate. One year may see two or three generations of the beetle. The adults overwinter in a dormant state underground or in nearby leaf litter.

The parasitic wasp, Tetrastichus coeruleus, occurring mainly in the United States and Europe, can cause up to 71% mortality in the field and has been successfully used for biological control.

Various insecticides (such as carbamates, pyrethroids, spinetoram, and spinosad) can be considered for pest control.

The similar spotted asparagus beetle (Crioceris duodecimpunctata) is also a pest as an adult, feeding on tender shoots and leaves, but since the larvae feed only on the asparagus berries it is not considered to be as important.

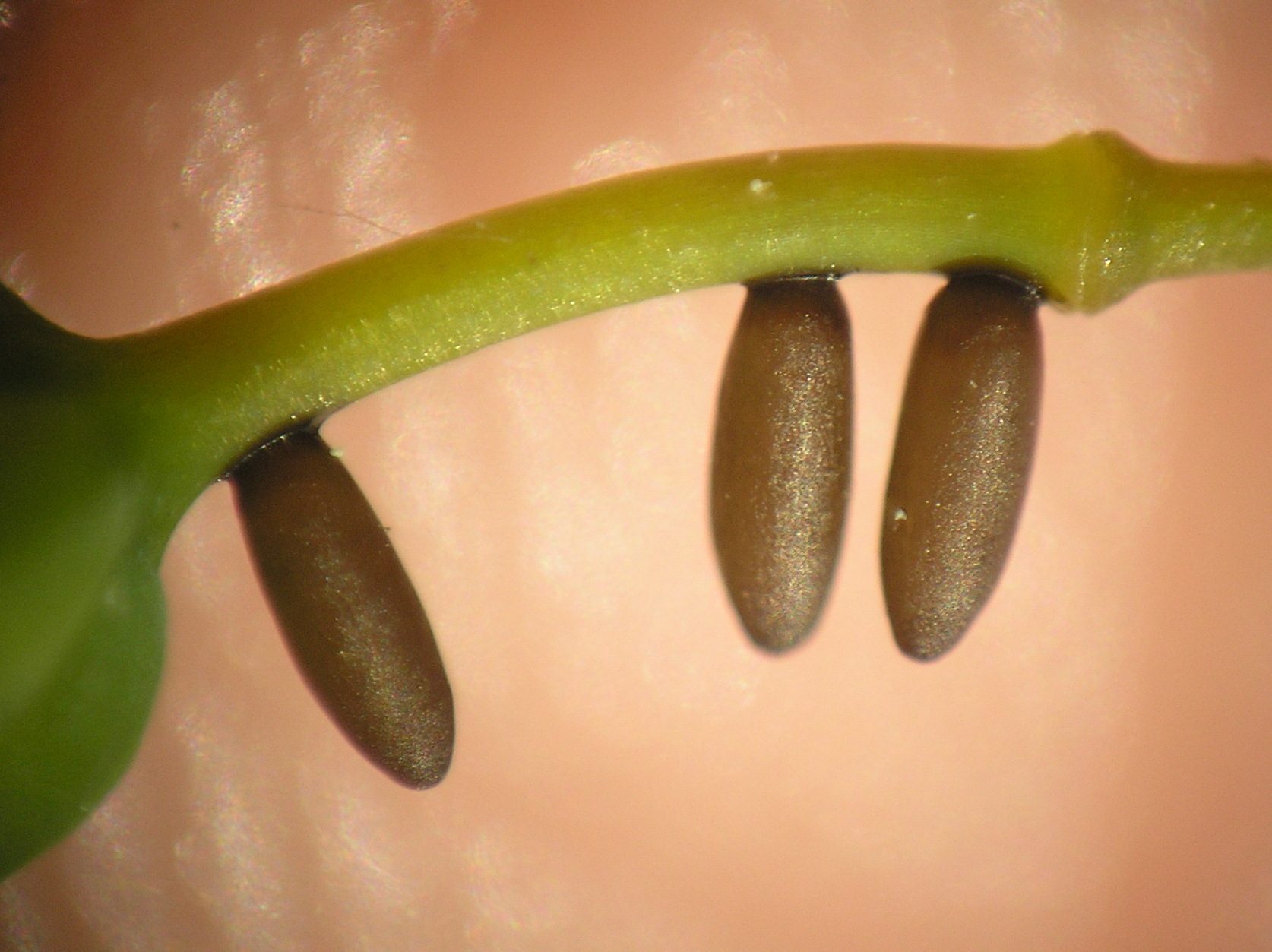
Eggs of the asparagus beetle, laid on the stem of a flower of an asparagus plant

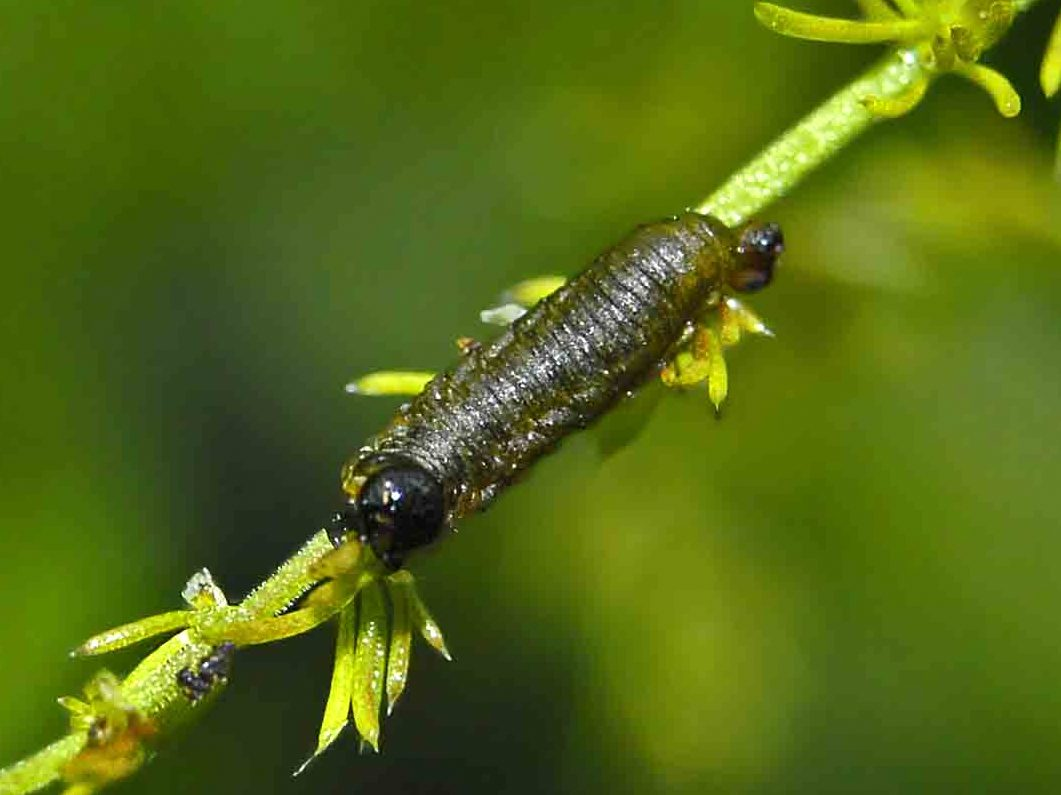
Larva of Crioceris asparagi
