= Lilioceris jianfenglingensis =

Scientific classification
- Kingdom: Animalia
- Phylum: Arthropoda
- Clade: Pancrustacea
- Class: Insecta
- Order: Coleoptera
- Suborder: Polyphaga
- Infraorder: Cucujiformia
- Family: Chrysomelidae
- Genus: Lilioceris
- Species: L. jianfenglingensis

Binomial name
- Lilioceris jianfenglingensis Long, 1988

Species of beetle

Lilioceris jianfenglingensis is a species of beetle in the family Chrysomelidae, known as the leaf beetles. It was described in 1988 by Chinese researcher and entomologist Jianguo Long. It is found in China.
