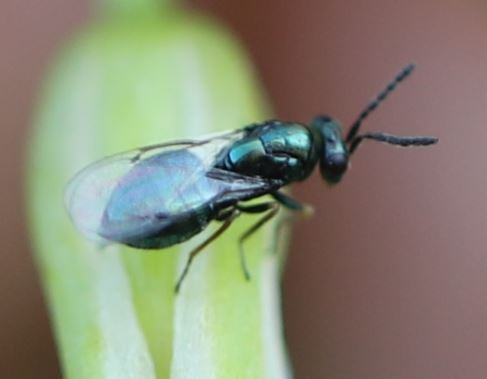

Scientific classification
- Kingdom: Animalia
- Phylum: Arthropoda
- Class: Insecta
- Order: Hymenoptera
- Family: Eulophidae
- Genus: Tetrastichus
- Species: T. coeruleus

Binomial name
- Tetrastichus coeruleus (Nees, 1834)

Synonyms
- Tetrastichus asparagi Crawford, 1909

= Tetrastichus coeruleus =

Species of wasp

Tetrastichus coeruleus is a gregarious koinobiont wasp which can be used as a biological control agent for the common asparagus beetle.

It was originally named Tetrastichus asparagi Crawford, thus most of the literature about this species has been published under this other name.

Tetrastichus coeruleus has populations which are infected with the parthenogenesis-inducing Wolbachia and populations which are not.

On average, 4.75 T. coeruleus adults emerge per larva, though this ranges between 2 and 13 specimens per larva.
