= Lemophagus pulcher =

Scientific classification
- Kingdom: Animalia
- Phylum: Arthropoda
- Class: Insecta
- Order: Hymenoptera
- Family: Ichneumonidae
- Genus: Lemophagus
- Species: L. pulcher

Binomial name
- Lemophagus pulcher (Szepligeti, 1916)

Species of wasp

Lemophagus pulcher is a species of insect in the family Ichneumonidae. It is found in China.
