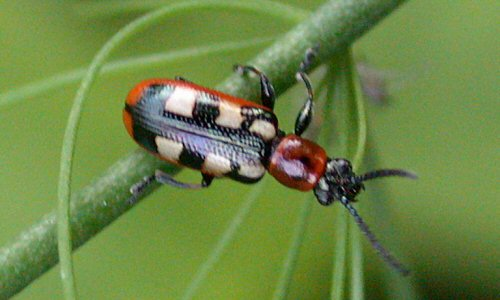
- Crioceris asparagi

Scientific classification
- Kingdom: Animalia
- Phylum: Arthropoda
- Class: Insecta
- Order: Coleoptera
- Suborder: Polyphaga
- Infraorder: Cucujiformia
- Family: Chrysomelidae
- Tribe: Criocerini
- Genus: Crioceris; Geoffroy, 1762

Species
- Crioceris asparagi; Crioceris duodecimpunctata; Crioceris quatuordecimpunctata

= Asparagus beetle =

Genus of beetles

Crioceris, or asparagus beetle, is a genus belonging to the family Chrysomelidae of beetles. The name is Neo-Latin from Greek κριός, ram and κέρας, horn. Not all species in the genus Crioceris feed on asparagus (e.g., C. nigropicta). Some studies have found low genetic diversity among groups of isolated Chrysomelidae, and use Wolbachia species as a genetic marker.

== Species ==
- Crioceris asparagi (Linnaeus, 1758), common asparagus beetle
- Crioceris bicruciata (Sahlberg, 1823)
- Crioceris duodecimpunctata (Linnaeus, 1758), spotted asparagus beetle
- Crioceris macilenta Weise, 1880
- Crioceris nigropunctata Lacordaire, 1845
- Crioceris paracenthesis (Linnaeus, 1767)
- Crioceris quatuordecimpunctata (Scopoli, 1763)
- Crioceris quinquepunctata (Scopoli, 1763)
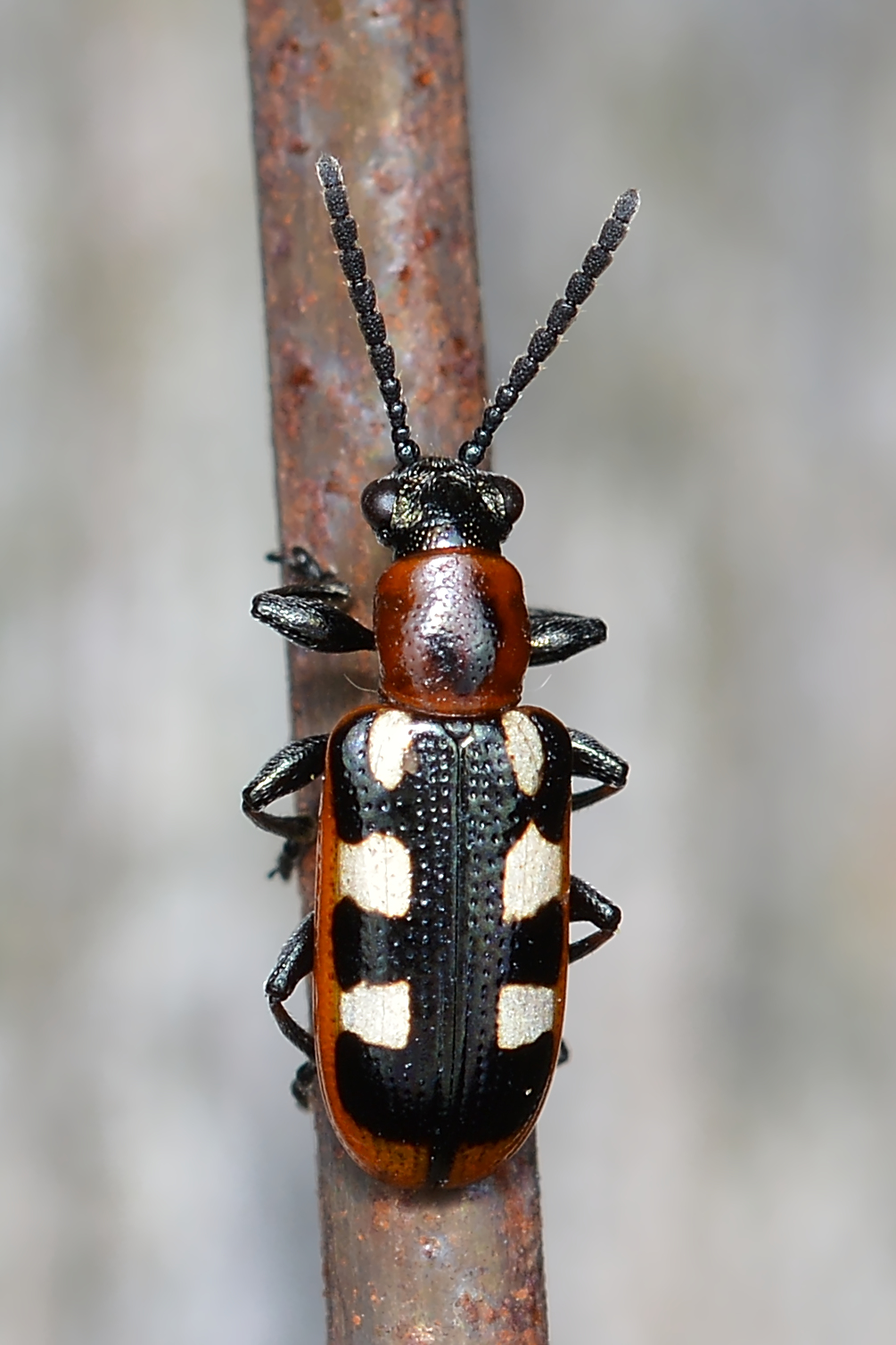
C. asparagi

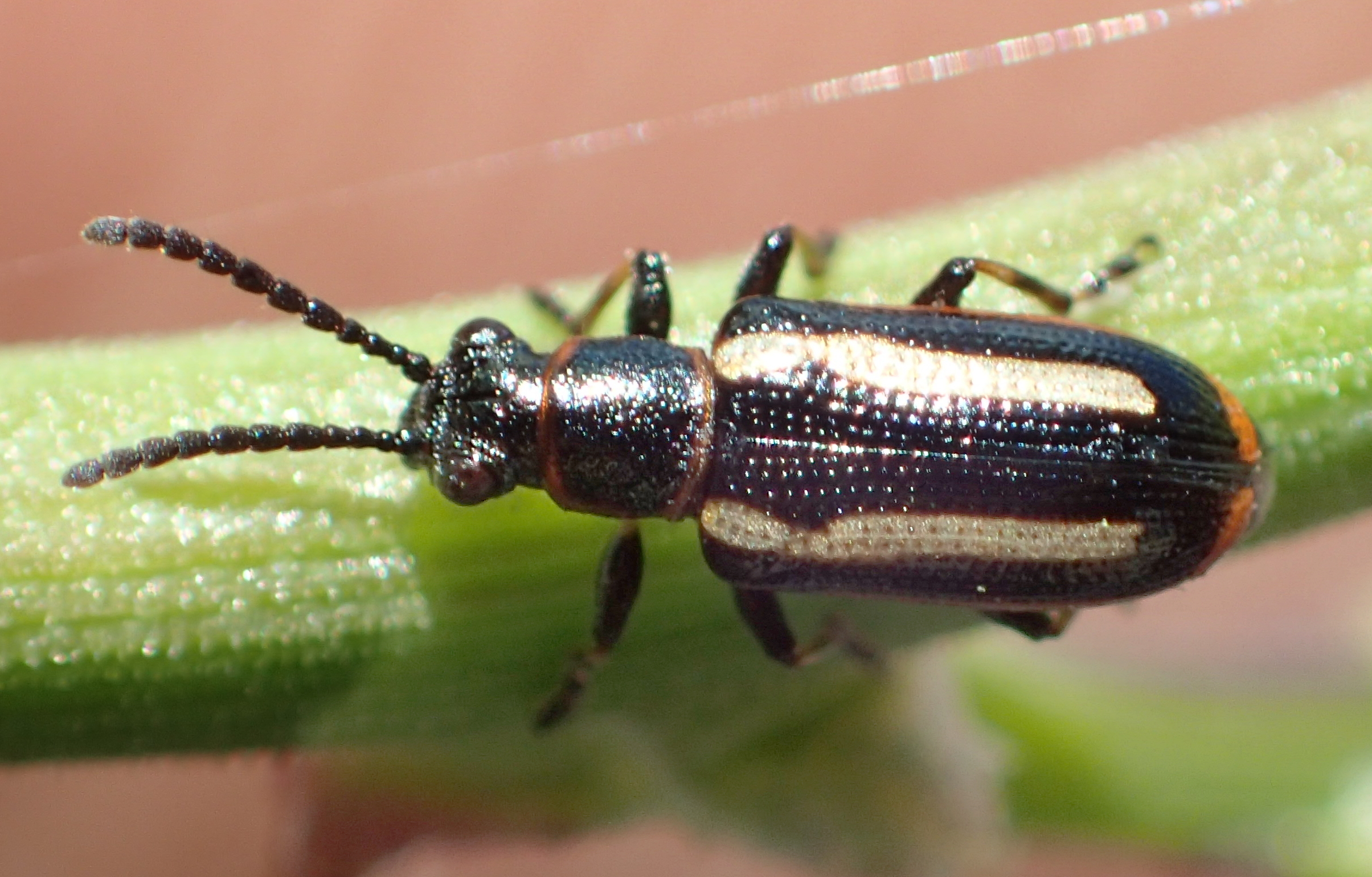
C. macilenta

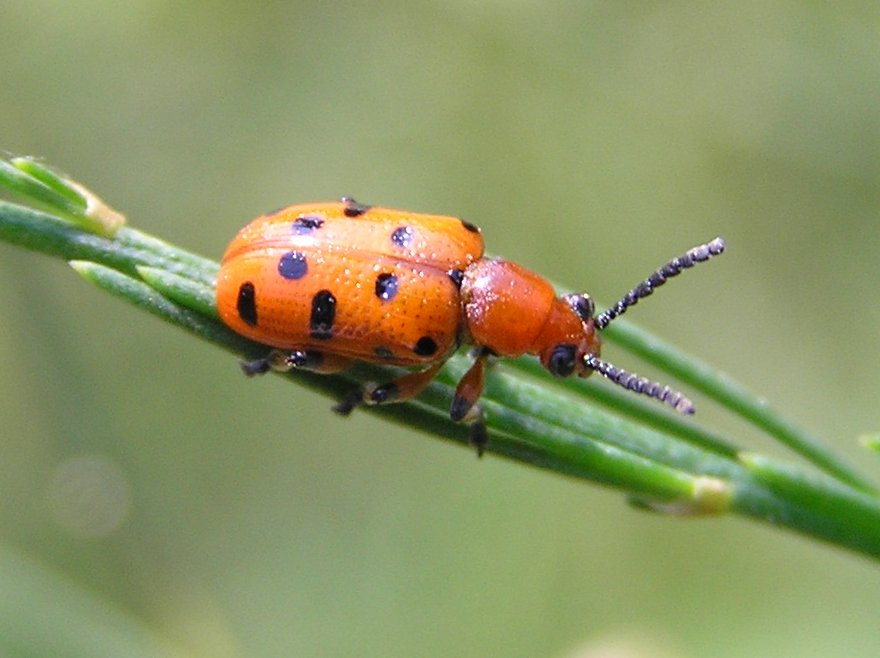
C. duodecimpunctata

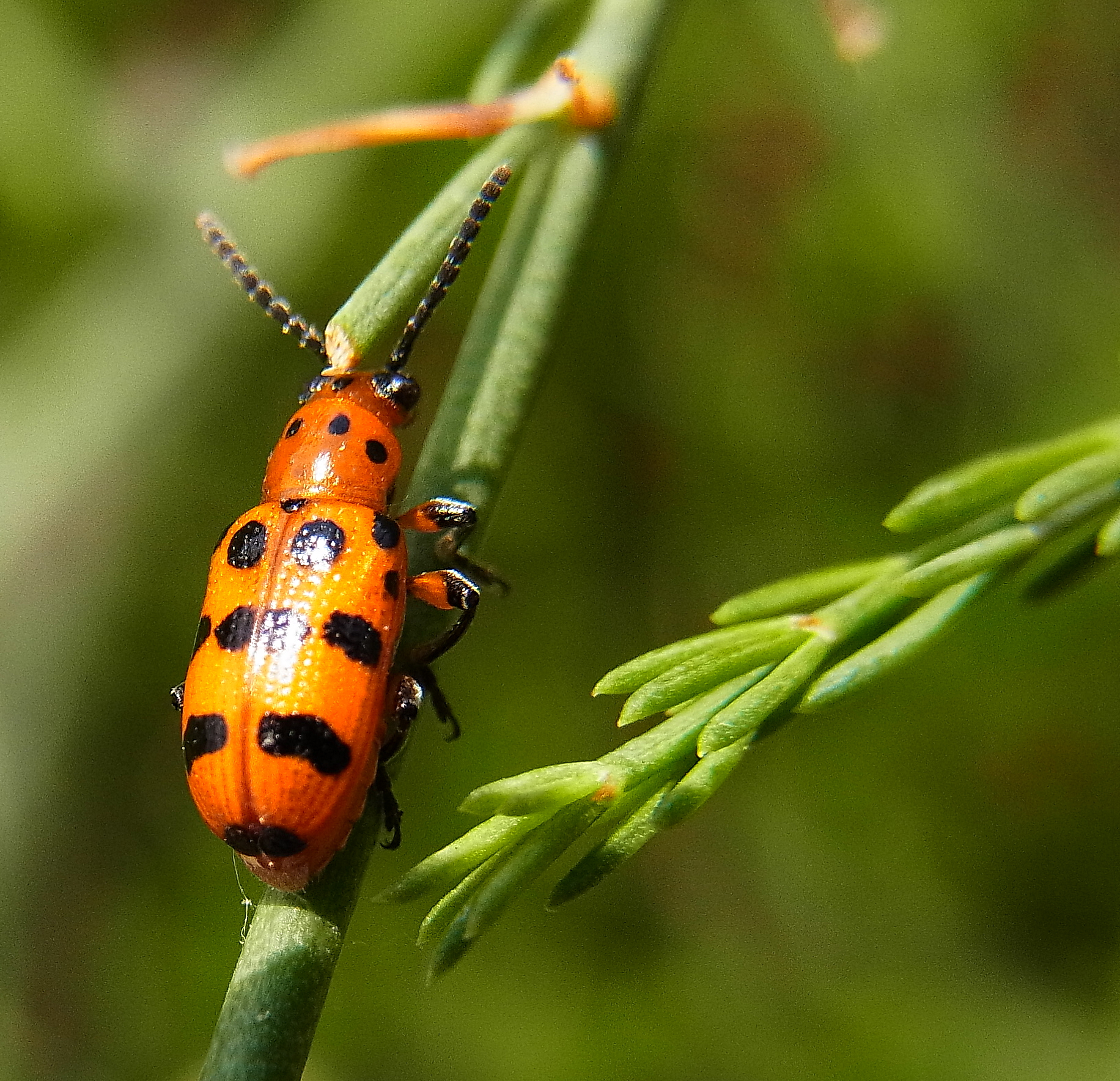
C. quatordecimpunctata

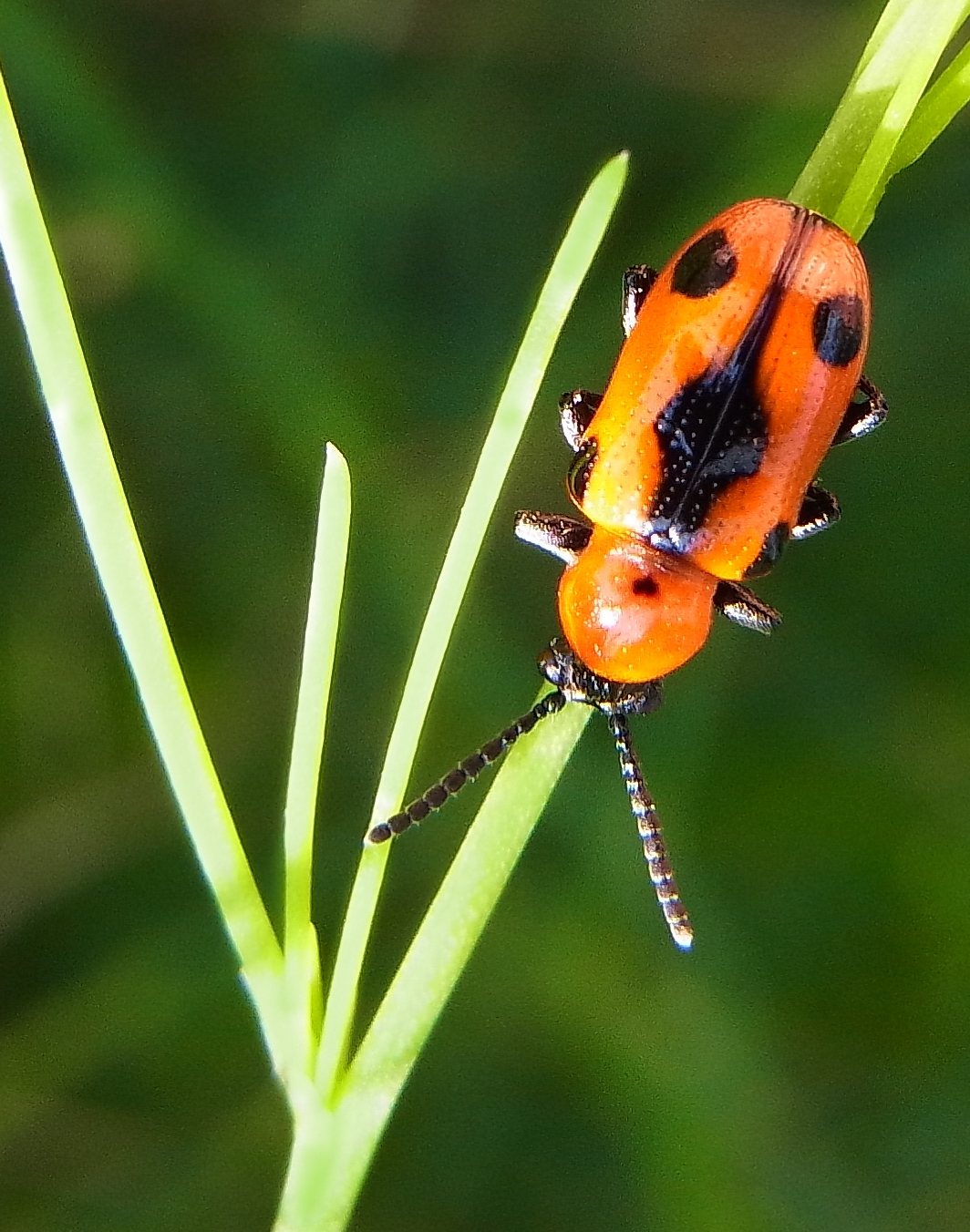
C. quinquepunctata

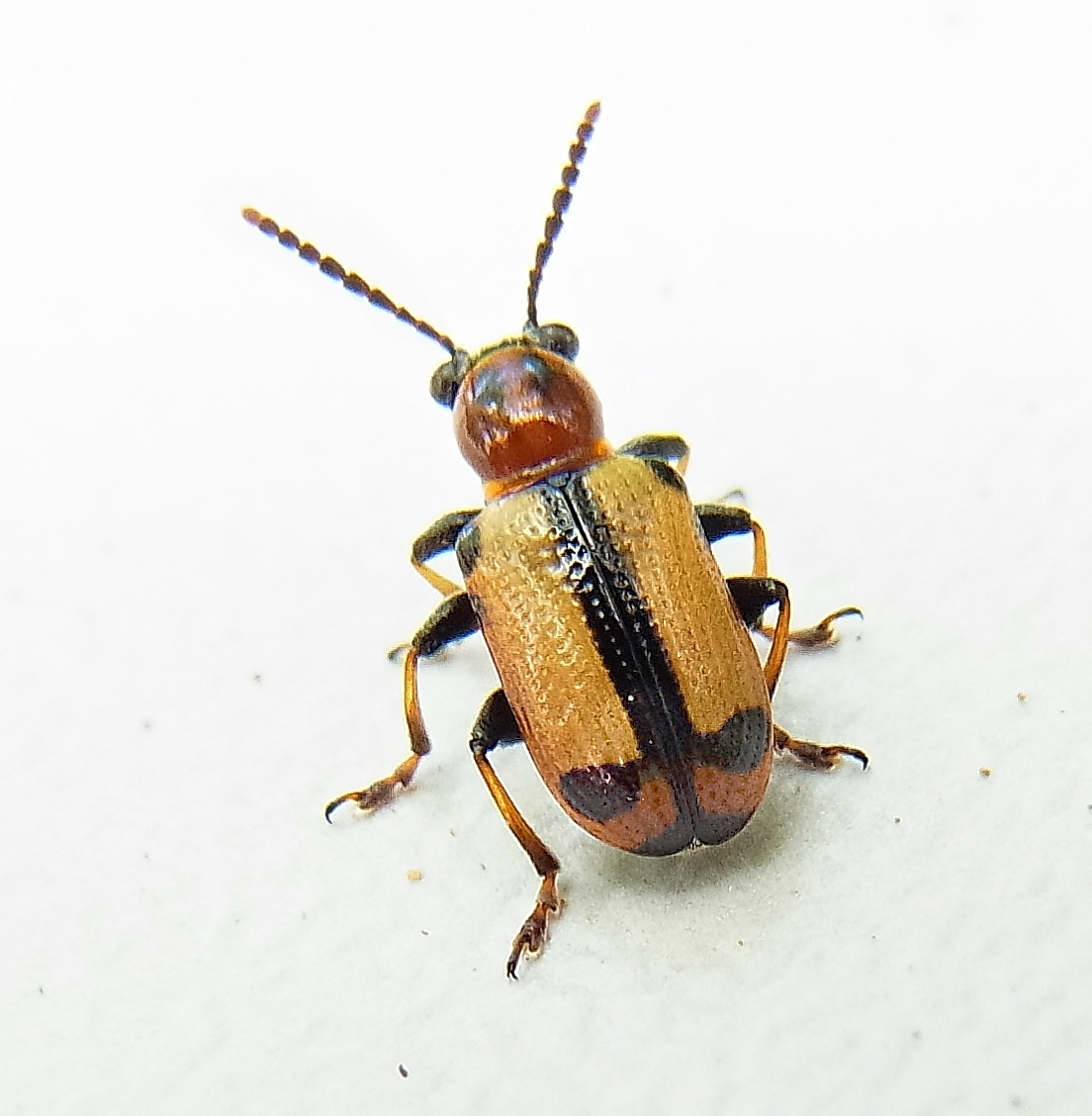
C. paracenthesis
