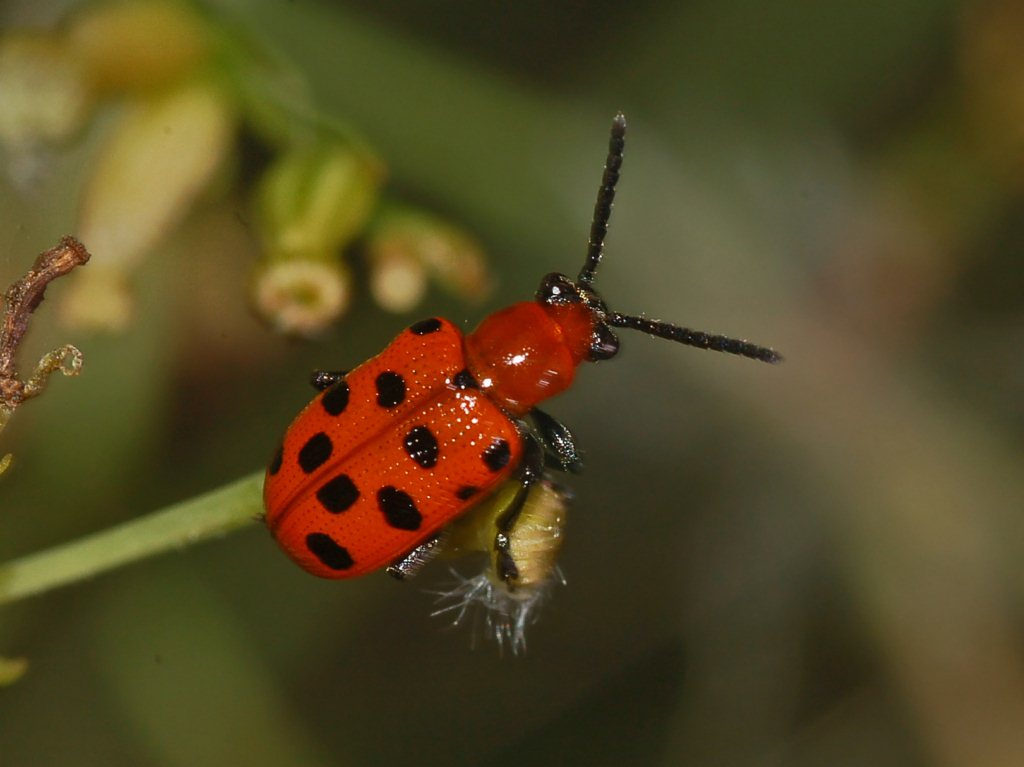
- Dorsal view
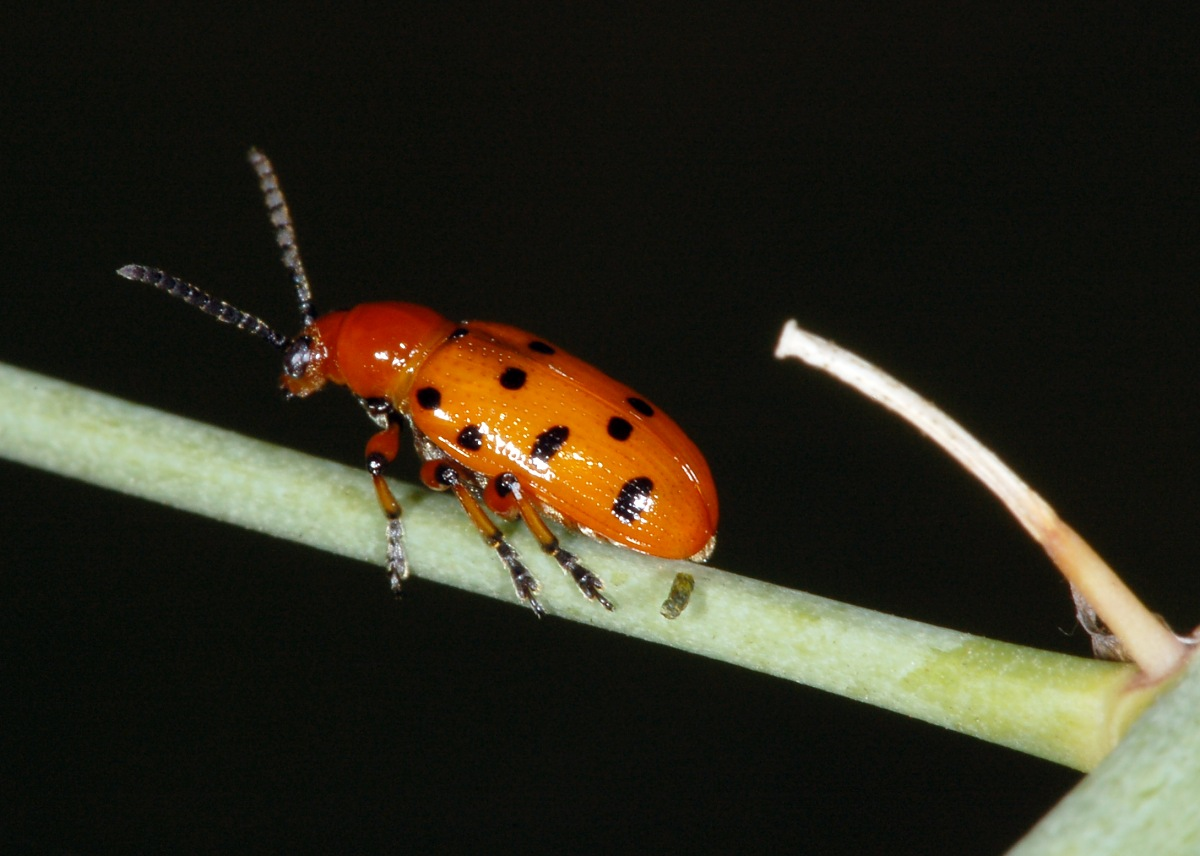
- Lateral view

Scientific classification
- Kingdom: Animalia
- Phylum: Arthropoda
- Class: Insecta
- Order: Coleoptera
- Suborder: Polyphaga
- Infraorder: Cucujiformia
- Family: Chrysomelidae
- Genus: Crioceris
- Species: C. duodecimpunctata

Binomial name
- Crioceris duodecimpunctata (Linnaeus, 1758)

Synonyms
- Chrysomela 12-punctata (Linnaeus, 1758); Lema dodecastigma (Suffrian, 1841)

= Crioceris duodecimpunctata =

Species of beetle

Crioceris duodecimpunctata or the spotted asparagus beetle is a species of shining leaf beetle belonging to the family Chrysomelidae, subfamily Criocerinae.

The length of beetles varies from 5 to 6.5 millimeters. The colour of head, pronotum and elytra is reddish orange, while the scutellum is black. On the elytra there are twelve black dots.

It feeds on Cucurbitaceae and asparagus species. The larvae feed only on the asparagus berries, being the second most important pest of this plant, while adults prefer tender shoots and leaves.

They are found in the whole Palearctic realm, including the British Isles.
