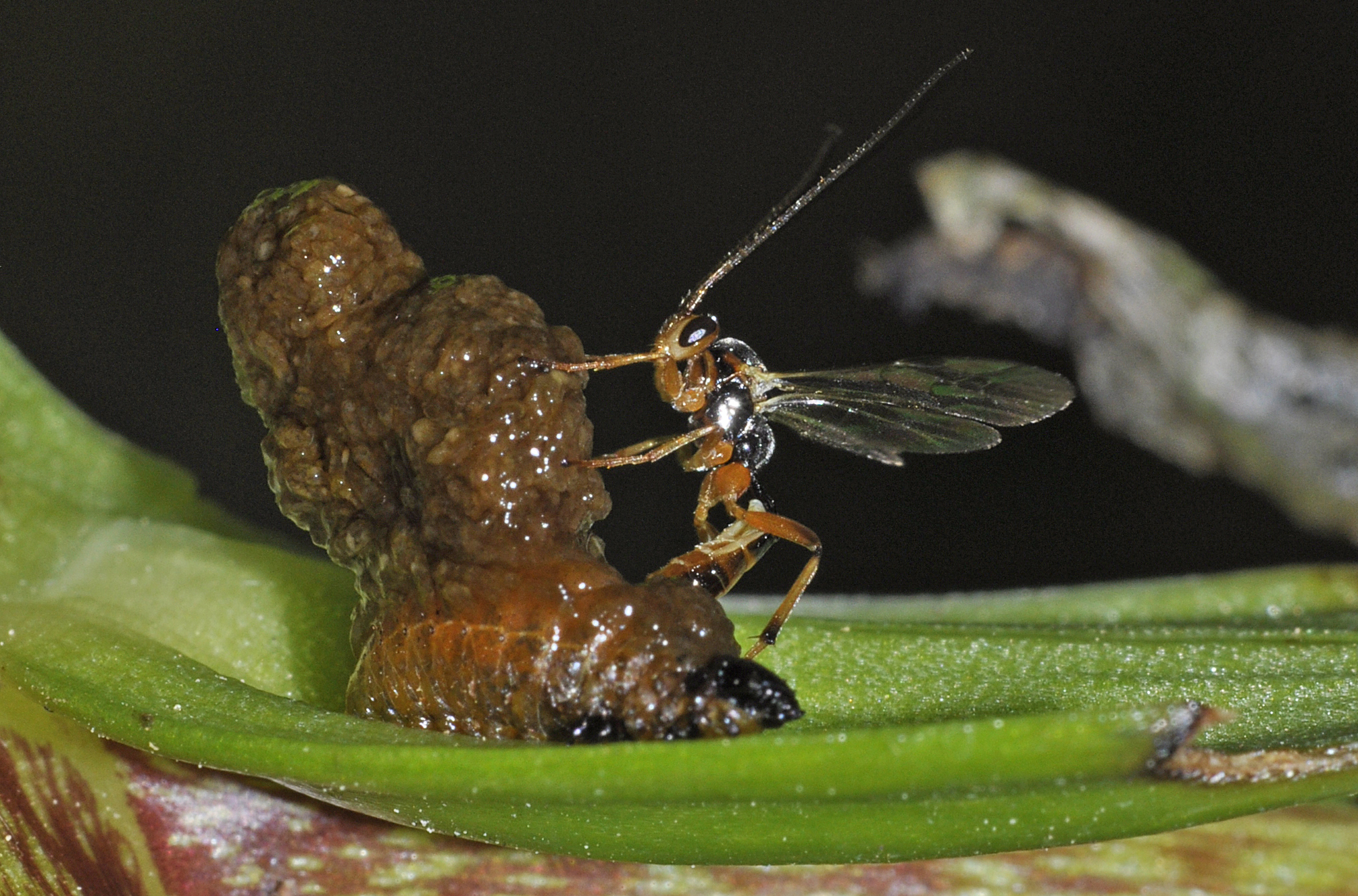

Scientific classification
- Kingdom: Animalia
- Phylum: Arthropoda
- Class: Insecta
- Order: Hymenoptera
- Family: Ichneumonidae
- Subfamily: Campopleginae
- Genus: Lemophagus; Townes, 1965

= Lemophagus =

Genus of wasps

Lemophagus is a genus of ichneumon wasps in the family Ichneumonidae.

== Species ==
These nine species belong to the genus Lemophagus:

- Lemophagus amurensis Kasparyan & Dbar, 1985^{c g}
- Lemophagus crioceritor Aubert, 1986^{c g}
- Lemophagus curtus Townes, 1965^{c g b}
- Lemophagus diversae Kusigemati, 1972^{c g}
- Lemophagus errabundus (Gravenhorst, 1829)^{c g}
- Lemophagus foersteri (Tschek, 1871)^{c g}
- Lemophagus japonicus (Sonan, 1930)^{c g}
- Lemophagus pulcher (Szepligeti, 1916)^{c}
- Lemophagus nanus

Data sources: i = ITIS, c = Catalogue of Life, g = GBIF, b = Bugguide.net
