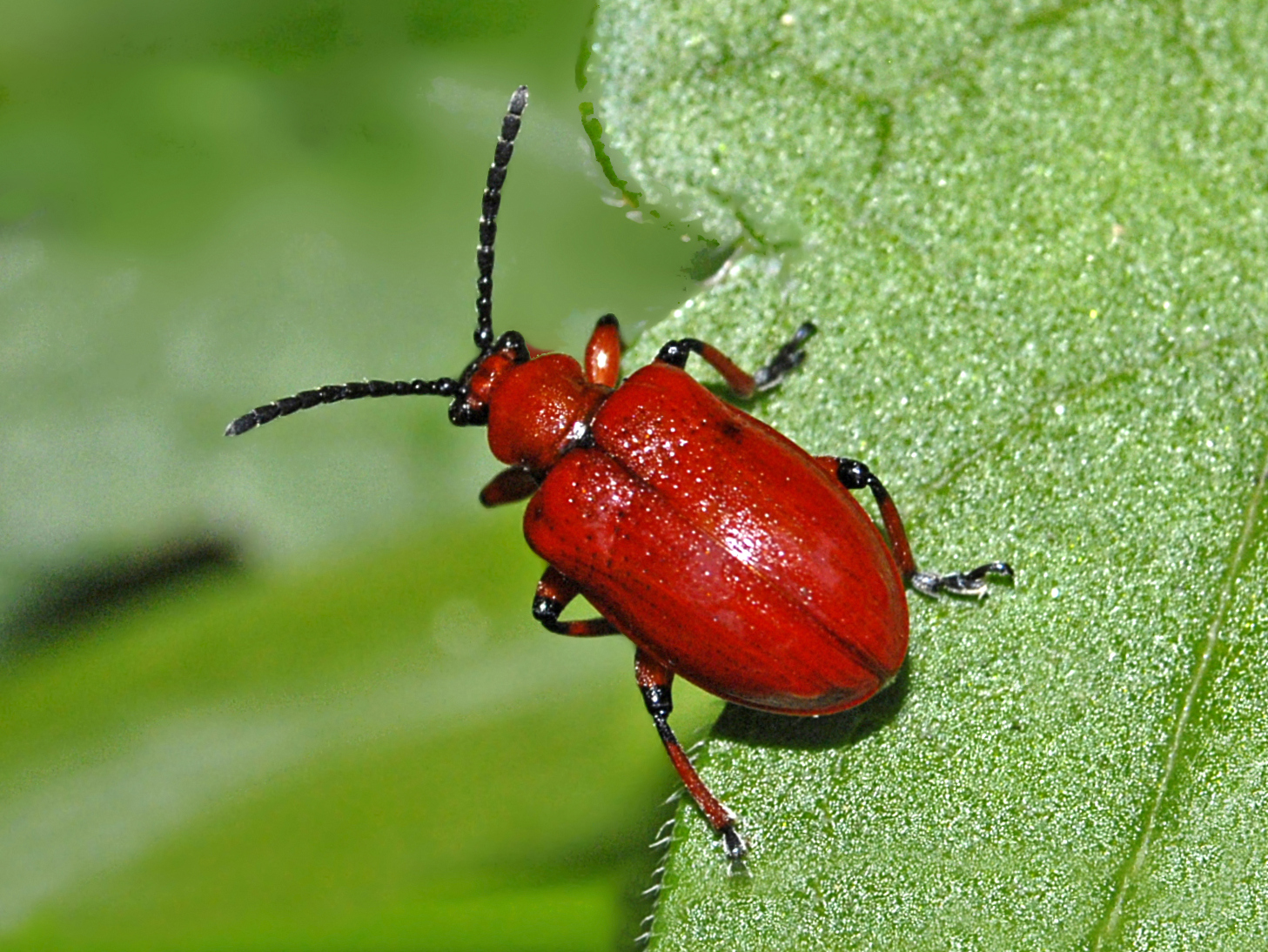
- Lilioceris merdigera

Scientific classification
- Kingdom: Animalia
- Phylum: Arthropoda
- Clade: Pancrustacea
- Class: Insecta
- Order: Coleoptera
- Suborder: Polyphaga
- Infraorder: Cucujiformia
- Superfamily: Chrysomeloidea
- Family: Chrysomelidae
- Subfamily: Criocerinae
- Tribe: Criocerini; Latreille, 1804

= Criocerini =

Tribe of beetles

Criocerini is a tribe of shining leaf beetles belonging to the family Chrysomelidae and subfamily Criocerinae.

== Genera ==
Genera within this tribe include:

- Crioceris Müller, 1764
- Lilioceris Reitter, 1912

== Bibliography ==
- Schmitt, M (2010). "Criocerinae (Crioceris, Lilioceris)". In Löbl, Ivan; Smetana, Ales (eds.). Chrysomeloidea. Brill. pp. 359–361, 364–366. ISBN 978-90-04-26091-7.
