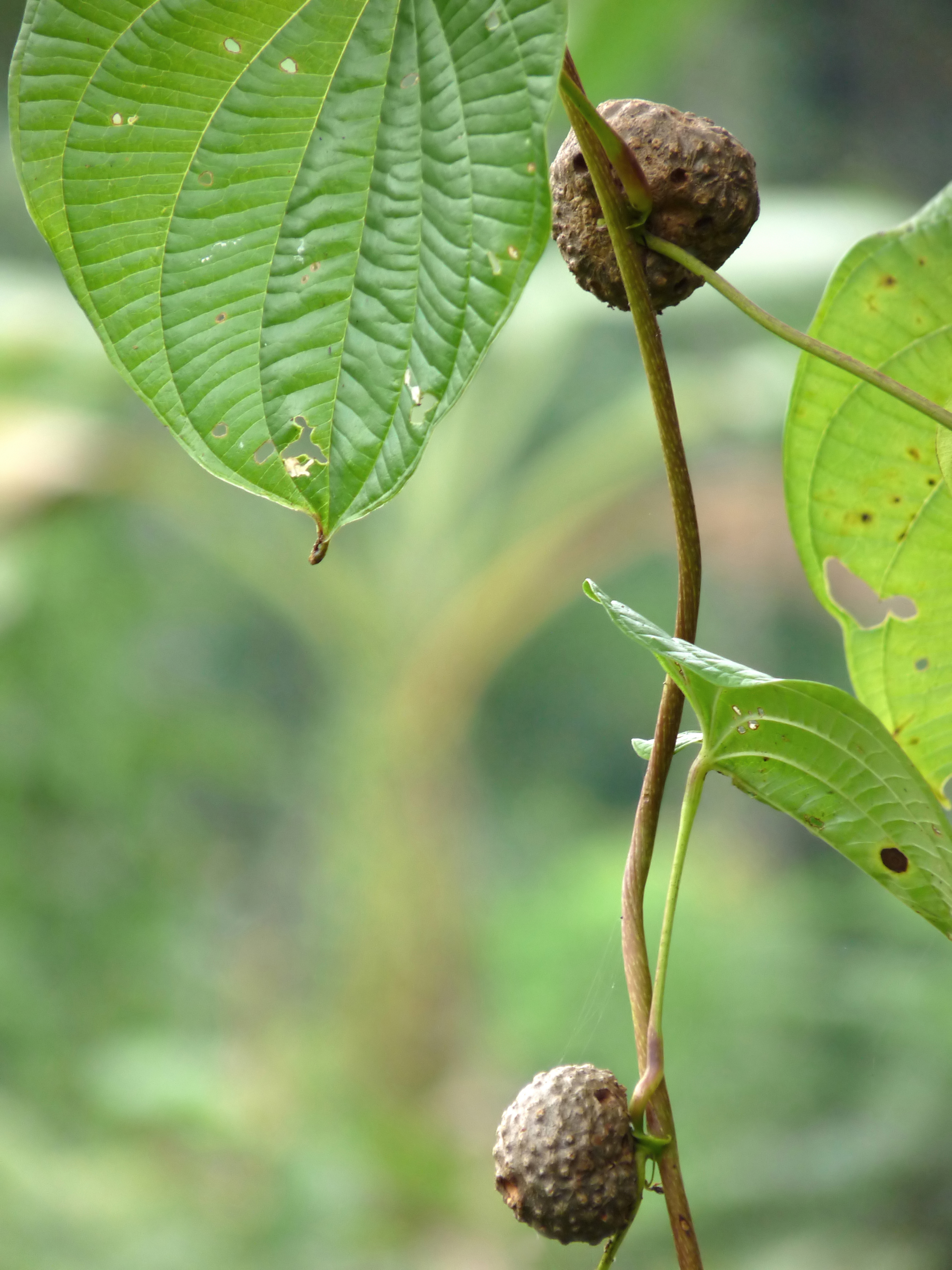

Scientific classification
- Kingdom: Plantae
- Clade: Tracheophytes
- Clade: Angiosperms
- Clade: Monocots
- Order: Dioscoreales
- Family: Dioscoreaceae
- Genus: Dioscorea
- Species: D. bulbifera

Binomial name
- Dioscorea bulbifera L.

Synonyms
- List: Helmia bulbifera (L.) Kunth; Polynome bulbifera (L.) Salisb.; Dioscorea anthropophagorum A.Chev.; Dioscorea crispata Roxb.; Dioscorea heterophylla Roxb.; Dioscorea hoffa Cordem.; Dioscorea hofika Jum. & H.Perrier; Dioscorea korrorensis R.Knuth; Dioscorea latifolia Benth.; Dioscorea longipetiolata Baudon; Dioscorea perrieri R.Knuth; Dioscorea pulchella Roxb.; Dioscorea rogersii Prain & Burkill; Dioscorea tamifolia Salisb.; Dioscorea tenuiflora Schltdl.

= Dioscorea bulbifera =

Species of flowering plant in the yam family

Dioscorea bulbifera (commonly known as the air potato, air yam, bitter yam, cheeky yam, potato yam, aerial yam, and parsnip yam) is a species of true yam in the yam family, Dioscoreaceae. It is native to Africa, Asia and northern Australia. It is widely cultivated and has become naturalized in many regions.

== Description ==
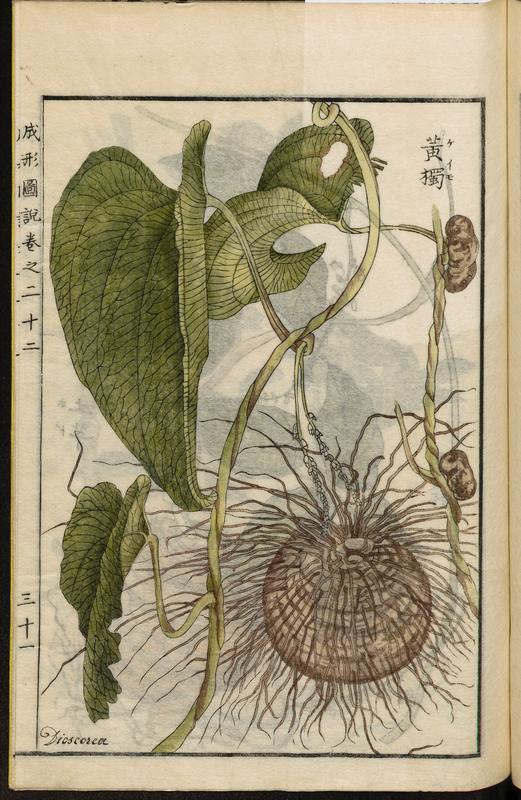
D. bulbifera L. from the Japanese Seikei Zusetsu agricultural encyclopedia

Dioscorea bulbifera is a perennial vine with broad, alternate leaves, and two types of storage organs. The plant forms bulbils in the leaf axils of the twining stems, and tubers beneath the ground. These tubers are like small, oblong potatoes.

Air potato can grow extremely quickly, roughly 20 centimetres (8 in) per day, and eventually reach over 18 metres (60 ft) long. It typically climbs to the tops of trees and has a tendency to take over native plants. New plants develop from bulbils that form on the plant, and these bulbils serve as a means of dispersal. The aerial stems of air potato die back in winter, but resprouting occurs from bulbils and underground tubers.

When it twists around another plant or some sort of support, it always twists counterclockwise, unlike the winged yam Dioscorea alata.

The primary means of spread and reproduction are by the bulbils. The smallest bulbils make control of air potato difficult due to their ability to sprout at a very small stage. The vine produces small white flowers; however, these are rarely seen when it grows in places such as Florida. The fruits are capsules.

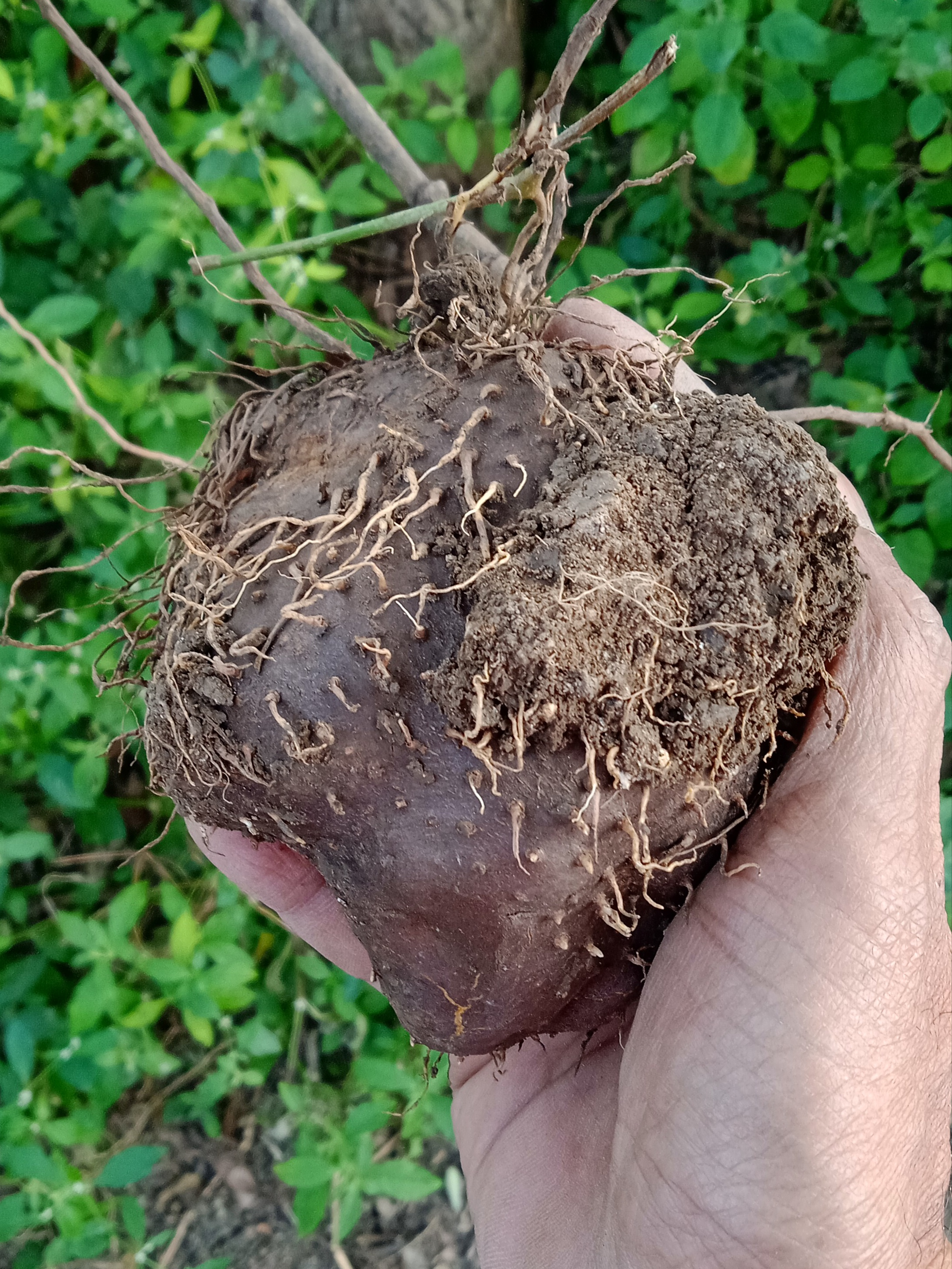
Corm (tuber)

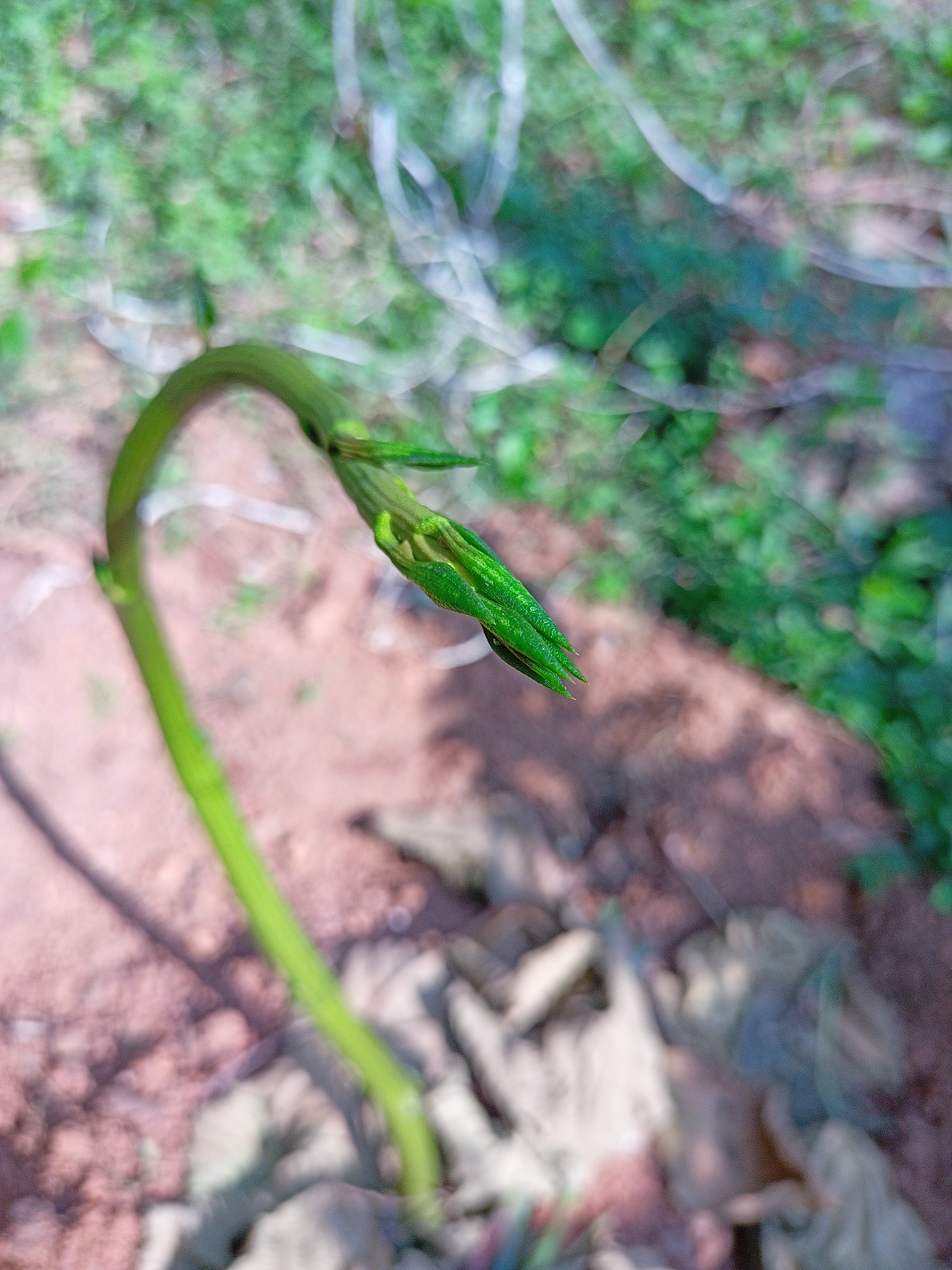
Shoot

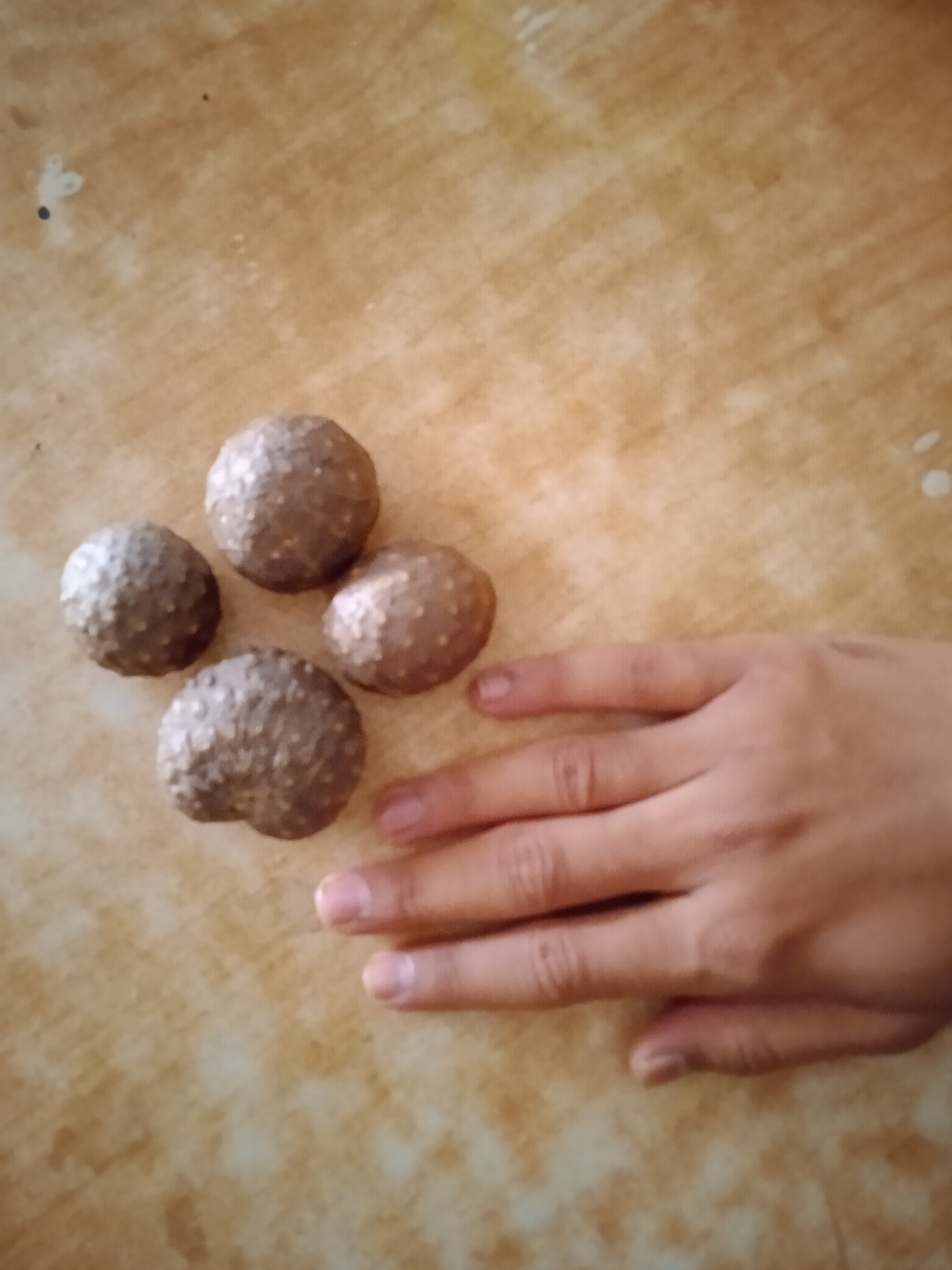
Bulbils

== Distribution and habitat ==
It is native to Africa, Asia and northern Australia. It is widely cultivated and has become naturalized in many regions (Latin America, the West Indies, the southeastern United States, and various oceanic islands).

It has been observed growing in habitats such as along forest edges, roadsides, as well as other environments with mesic, loamy sand.

== As an invasive species ==
In some places, such as Florida, it is considered a noxious weed because of its quick-growing, large-leafed vine that spreads tenaciously and shades out any plants growing beneath it. The bulbils on the vines sprout and become new vines, twisting around each other to form a thick mat. If the plant is cut to the ground, the tubers can survive for extended periods and send up new shoots later.

The leaf beetle Lilioceris cheni has been studied and employed as an agent of biological pest control for the plant, with releases in 2012.

== Toxicity ==
Uncultivated forms, such as those found growing wild in Florida, can be poisonous. These varieties contain the steroid diosgenin, which is a principal material used in the manufacture of a number of synthetic steroidal hormones, such as those used in hormonal contraception. There have been claims that even the wild forms are rendered edible after drying and boiling, leading to confusion over actual toxicity.

== Uses ==
Some varieties produce edible tubers and are cultivated as a food crop, especially in West Africa. The tubers of edible varieties often have a bitter taste, which can be removed by boiling. They can then be prepared in the same way as other yams, potatoes, and sweet potatoes.

Air potato has been used as a folk remedy to treat conjunctivitis, diarrhoea, and dysentery, among other ailments.

D. bulbifera is highly important to the Tiwi people of Australia, who use it in an important ceremony called kulama. During the ceremony, the tubers are ritually cooked, and eaten on the third day.

It is known as the up-yam in Nigerian Pidgin English, since the plant is cultivated more for its bulbils than for its tubers.

== See also ==
- Domesticated plants and animals of Austronesia
- Yam production in Nigeria
