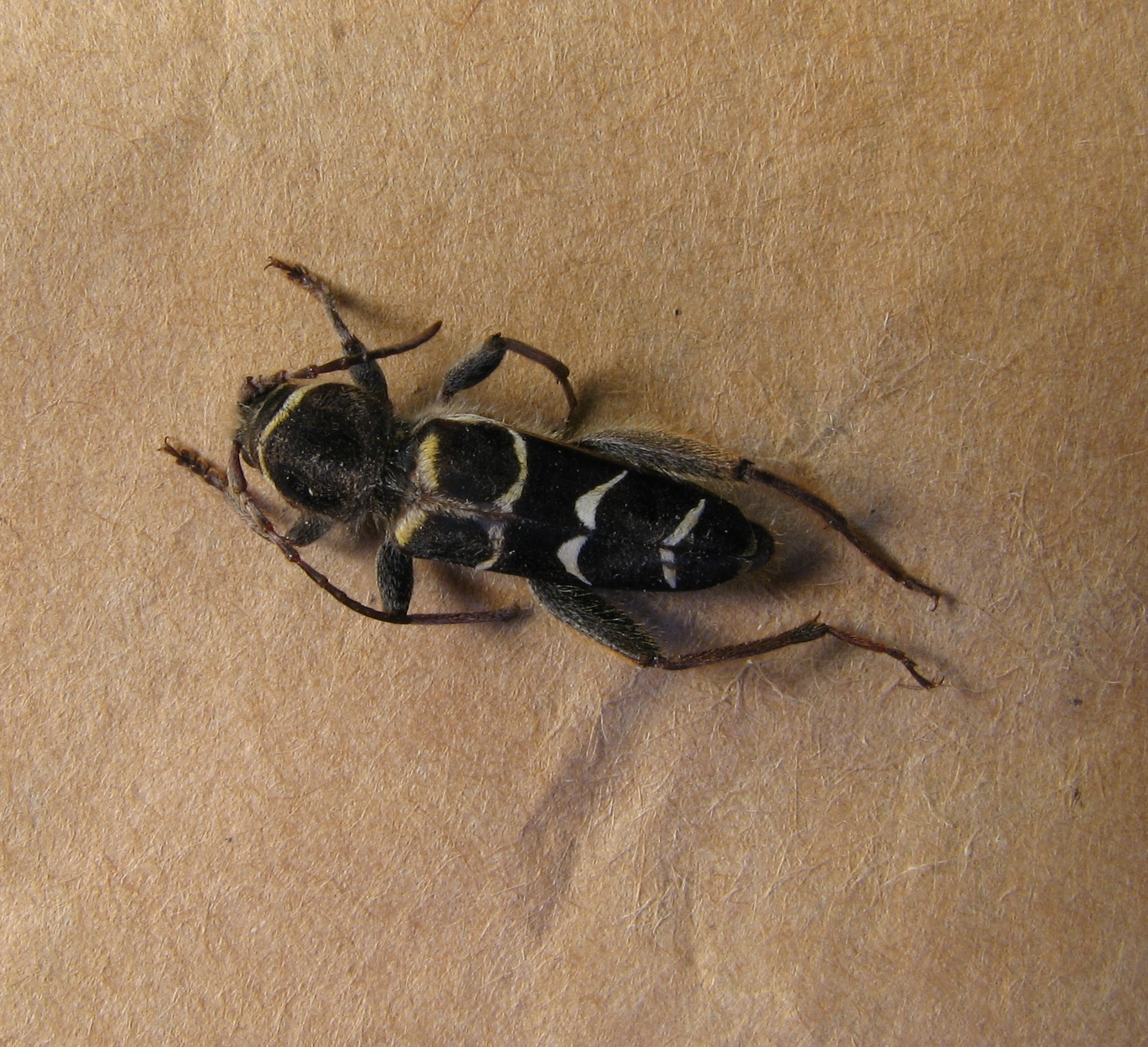
- Neoclytus caprea

Scientific classification
- Kingdom: Animalia
- Phylum: Arthropoda
- Class: Insecta
- Order: Coleoptera
- Suborder: Polyphaga
- Infraorder: Cucujiformia
- Family: Cerambycidae
- Subfamily: Cerambycinae
- Tribe: Clytini; Mulsant, 1839

= Clytini =

Tribe of beetles

Clytini is a tribe of beetles in the subfamily Cerambycinae, containing the following genera:

== Genera ==
- Abacoclytus Pesarini & Sabbadini, 1997
- Acrocyrta Pascoe, 1856
- Amamiclytus K. Ohbayashi, 1964
- Amyipunga Martins & Galileo, 2011
- Anthoboscus Chevrolat, 1860
- Ayriclytus Martins & Galileo, 2011
- Brachyclytus Kraatz, 1879
- Calanthemis Thomson, 1864
- Calloides LeConte, 1873
- Carinoclytus Aurivillius, 1912
- Cetimaju Galileo & Martins, 2007
- Chlorophorus Chevrolat, 1863
- Clytobius Gressitt, 1951
- Clytocera Gahan, 1906
- Clytoleptus Casey, 1912
- Clytopsis Casey, 1912
- Clytosaurus Thomson, 1864
- Clytus Laicharting, 1784
- Cotyclytus Martins & Galileo, 2011
- Cyrtoclytus Ganglbauer, 1881
- Demonax Thomson, 1860
- Denticerus Jordan, 1894
- Dexithea Thomson, 1864
- Epiclytus Gressitt, 1935
- Euryscelis Dejean, 1835
- Glycobius LeConte, 1873
- Hesperoclytus Holzschuh, 1986
- Ischnodora Chevrolat, 1863
- Isotomus Mulsant, 1863
- Itaclytus Martins & Galileo, 2011
- Kazuoclytus Hayashi, 1968
- Laodemonax Gressitt & Rondon, 1972
- Mecometopus Thomson, 1860
- Megacheuma Mickel, 1919
- Megacyllene Casey, 1912
- Miriclytus Martins & Galileo, 2011
- Neoclytus Thomson, 1860
- Neoplagionotus Kasatkin, 2005
- Ochraethes Chevrolat, 1860
- Perissus Chevrolat, 1863
- Petraphuma Viktora, 2018
- Pirangoclytus Martins & Galileo, 2011
- Placoclytus Chemsak & Linsley, 1974
- Placosternus Hopping, 1937
- Plagionotulus Jordan, 1894
- Plagionotus Mulsant, 1842
- Plagithmysus Motschulsky, 1845
- Plesioclytus Giesbert, 1993
- Pseudosphegesthes Reitter, 1912
- Psilomerus Chevrolat, 1863
- Rhabdoclytus Ganglbauer, 1889
- Rhaphuma Pascoe, 1858
- Rostroclytus Martins & Galileo, 2011
- Sarosesthes Thomson, 1864
- Sinoclytus Holzschuh, 1995
- Tanyochraethes Chemsak & Linsley, 1965
- Teratoclytus Zaitzev, 1937
- Thranodes Pascoe, 1869
- Trichoxys Chevrolat, 1860
- Triodoclytus Casey, 1913
- Tylcus Casey, 1912
- Unaiuba Martins & Galileo, 2011
- Xylotrechus Chevrolat, 1860
- Ygapema Martins & Galileo, 2011
