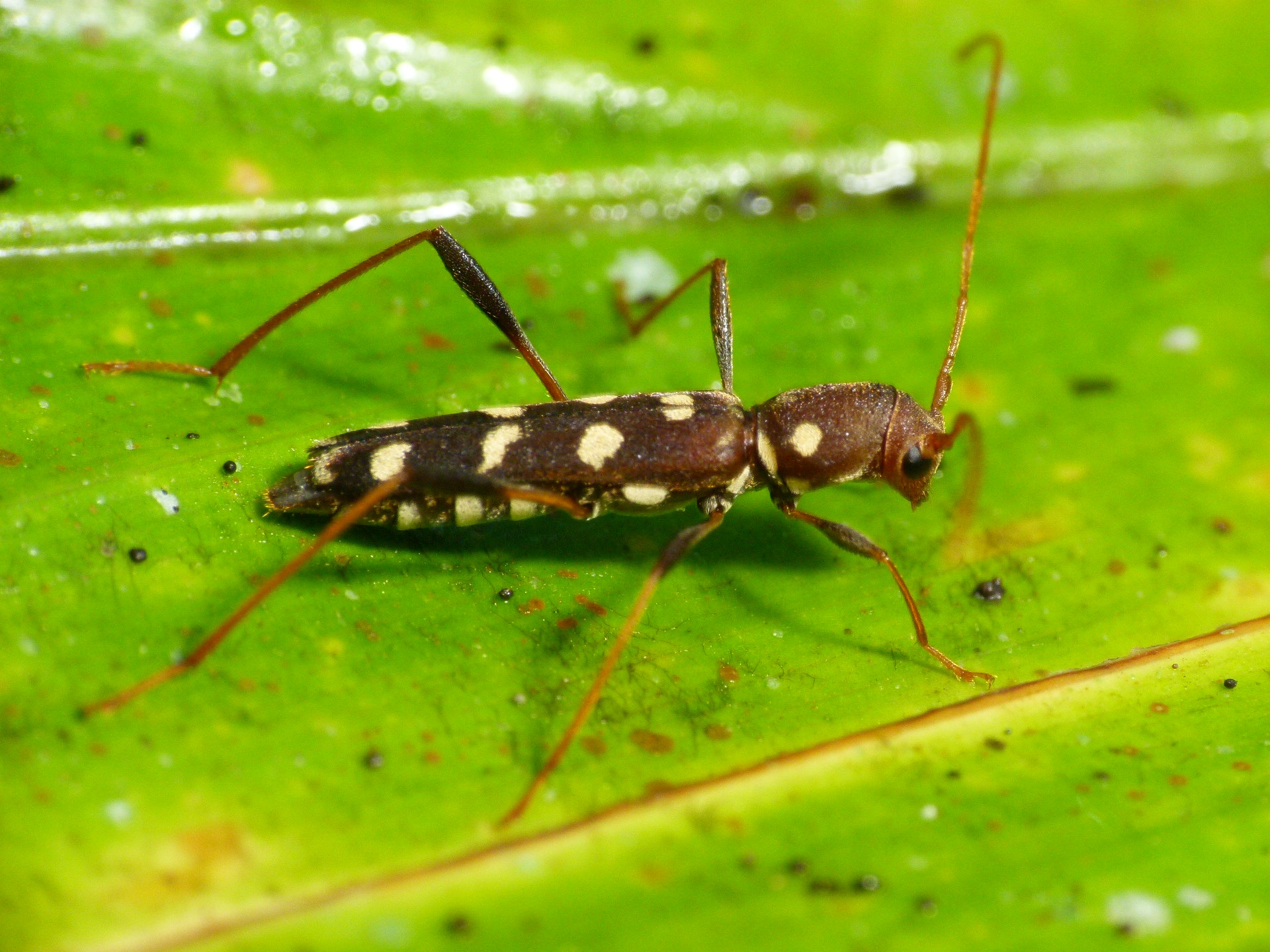
- Clytocera chionospila

Scientific classification
- Domain: Eukaryota
- Kingdom: Animalia
- Phylum: Arthropoda
- Class: Insecta
- Order: Coleoptera
- Suborder: Polyphaga
- Infraorder: Cucujiformia
- Family: Cerambycidae
- Tribe: Clytini
- Genus: Clytocera; Gahan, 1906

Type species
- Clytocera chionospila Gahan, 1906

= Clytocera =

Genus of beetles

Clytocera is a genus of long-horned beetle in the tribe Clytini. The genus was erected in 1906 for the southern Indian species Clytocera chionospila by Charles Joseph Gahan. The genus was separated from Rhaphuma on the basis of raised and divergent antennal supports.

Species in the genus include:

- Clytocera assamensis Viktora & Tichy, 2017 from Assam
- Clytocera anhea Gressitt & Rondon, 1970
- Clytocera chionospila Gahan, 1906
- Clytocera gujaratensis Viktora & Tichy, 2017 (Gujarat, Karnataka)
- Clytocera luteofasciata Gressitt & Rondon, 1970
- Clytocera montensis Gressitt & Rondon, 1970
- Clytocera pilosa Gressitt & Rondon, 1970
- Clytocera taiwanensis Hayashi, 1974
