= Rhaphuma kuznetsovi =

Scientific classification
- Kingdom: Animalia
- Phylum: Arthropoda
- Clade: Pancrustacea
- Class: Insecta
- Order: Coleoptera
- Suborder: Polyphaga
- Infraorder: Cucujiformia
- Family: Cerambycidae
- Genus: Rhaphuma
- Species: R. kuznetsovi

Binomial name
- Rhaphuma kuznetsovi Lazarev, 2026

Species of beetle

Rhaphuma kuznetsovi is a species of beetle in the family Cerambycidae. It was described by Maxim Lazarev in 2026. It is known from Far East Russia.

== Name ==
Rhaphuma kuznetsovi Lazarev & Ambrus, 2026: 240

Type locality: Russia, Primorsky Region, Chuguevka District, Sokolovka River.

Holotype: Coll. Lazarev. male, Russia, Primorsky Region, Chuguevka District, Sokolovka River, 15.7.1974, V. Kuznetsov leg.

Etymology: The species is dedicated to a great Russian entomologist from Far East Russian, a big specialist on Coccinellidae Viktor Nikolaevich Kuznetsov (13.10.1944 - 7.12.2006), who collected the holotype of the new species.
