= Placoclytus =

Scientific classification
- Kingdom: Animalia
- Phylum: Arthropoda
- Class: Insecta
- Order: Coleoptera
- Suborder: Polyphaga
- Infraorder: Cucujiformia
- Family: Cerambycidae
- Tribe: Clytini
- Genus: Placoclytus

Genus of beetles

Placoclytus is a genus of beetles in the family Cerambycidae, containing the following species:

- Placoclytus championi (Bates, 1885)
- Placoclytus distortus (Chevrolat, 1860)
- Placoclytus virgulatus Chemsak & Linsley, 1974
