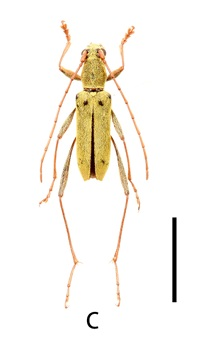
- Male
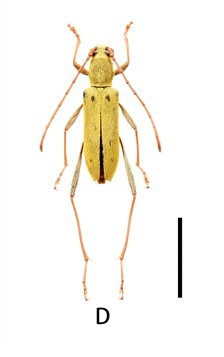
- Female

Scientific classification
- Domain: Eukaryota
- Kingdom: Animalia
- Phylum: Arthropoda
- Class: Insecta
- Order: Coleoptera
- Suborder: Polyphaga
- Infraorder: Cucujiformia
- Family: Cerambycidae
- Genus: Petraphuma
- Species: P. boreolaosica

Binomial name
- Petraphuma boreolaosica (Viktora & Tichý, 2017)

Synonyms
- Rhaphuma boreolaosica Viktora & Tichý, 2017

= Petraphuma boreolaosica =

Species of beetle

Petraphuma boreolaosica is a species of beetle in the family Cerambycidae. This species is found in Laos and China (Yunnan).
