= Mecometopus polygenus =

Scientific classification
- Domain: Eukaryota
- Kingdom: Animalia
- Phylum: Arthropoda
- Class: Insecta
- Order: Coleoptera
- Suborder: Polyphaga
- Infraorder: Cucujiformia
- Family: Cerambycidae
- Genus: Mecometopus
- Species: M. polygenus

Binomial name
- Mecometopus polygenus Thomson, 1860

Species of beetle

Mecometopus polygenus is a species of beetle in the family Cerambycidae. It was described by Thomson in 1860.
