= Dexithea humeralis =

Scientific classification
- Kingdom: Animalia
- Phylum: Arthropoda
- Class: Insecta
- Order: Coleoptera
- Suborder: Polyphaga
- Infraorder: Cucujiformia
- Family: Cerambycidae
- Genus: Dexithea
- Species: D. humeralis

Binomial name
- Dexithea humeralis Chemsak & Noguera, 2001

Species of beetle

Dexithea humeralis is a species of beetle in the family Cerambycidae. It was described by Chemsak and Noguera in 2001.
