= Trichoxys viridicollis =

Scientific classification
- Domain: Eukaryota
- Kingdom: Animalia
- Phylum: Arthropoda
- Class: Insecta
- Order: Coleoptera
- Suborder: Polyphaga
- Infraorder: Cucujiformia
- Family: Cerambycidae
- Genus: Trichoxys
- Species: T. viridicollis

Binomial name
- Trichoxys viridicollis (Chevrolat, 1860)

Species of beetle

Trichoxys viridicollis is a species of beetle in the family Cerambycidae. It was described by Chevrolat in 1860.
