= Ygapema =

Scientific classification
- Kingdom: Animalia
- Phylum: Arthropoda
- Class: Insecta
- Order: Coleoptera
- Suborder: Polyphaga
- Infraorder: Cucujiformia
- Family: Cerambycidae
- Tribe: Clytini
- Genus: Ygapema

Genus of beetles

Ygapema is a genus of beetles in the family Cerambycidae, containing the following species:

- Ygapema accentifer (Gounelle, 1910)
- Ygapema arixi (Martins & Galileo, 2005)
- Ygapema boliviana (Belon, 1899)
- Ygapema clavata (Chevrolat, 1862)
- Ygapema delicata (Gounelle, 1911)
- Ygapema errata (Martins & Galileo, 2008)
- Ygapema michelleae (Schmid, 2011)
- Ygapema mulleri (Fuchs, 1955)
- Ygapema plaumanni (Fuchs, 1966)
