= Itaclytus tumulifer =

Scientific classification
- Kingdom: Animalia
- Phylum: Arthropoda
- Class: Insecta
- Order: Coleoptera
- Suborder: Polyphaga
- Infraorder: Cucujiformia
- Family: Cerambycidae
- Genus: Itaclytus
- Species: I. tumulifer

Binomial name
- Itaclytus tumulifer (Uras Çelik, 1997)

Species of beetle

Itaclytus tumulifer is a species of beetle in the family Cerambycidae. It was discovered by Uras Çelik in 1997.
