= Itaclytus =

Scientific classification
- Kingdom: Animalia
- Phylum: Arthropoda
- Class: Insecta
- Order: Coleoptera
- Suborder: Polyphaga
- Infraorder: Cucujiformia
- Family: Cerambycidae
- Tribe: Clytini
- Genus: Itaclytus

Genus of beetles

Itaclytus is a genus of beetles in the family Cerambycidae, containing the following species:

- Itaclytus justini (Chevrolat, 1862)
- Itaclytus olivaceus (Laporte & Gory, 1835)
- Itaclytus tumulifer (Aurivillius, 1908)
