= Mecometopus leprieuri =

Scientific classification
- Domain: Eukaryota
- Kingdom: Animalia
- Phylum: Arthropoda
- Class: Insecta
- Order: Coleoptera
- Suborder: Polyphaga
- Infraorder: Cucujiformia
- Family: Cerambycidae
- Genus: Mecometopus
- Species: M. leprieuri

Binomial name
- Mecometopus leprieuri (Laporte & Gory, 1835)

Species of beetle

Mecometopus leprieuri is a species of beetle in the family Cerambycidae. It was described by Laporte and Gory in 1835.
