= Mecometopus =

Scientific classification
- Domain: Eukaryota
- Kingdom: Animalia
- Phylum: Arthropoda
- Class: Insecta
- Order: Coleoptera
- Suborder: Polyphaga
- Infraorder: Cucujiformia
- Family: Cerambycidae
- Tribe: Clytini
- Genus: Mecometopus

Genus of beetles

Mecometopus is a genus of beetles in the family Cerambycidae, containing the following species:

- Mecometopus aesopus (Chevrolat, 1860)
- Mecometopus aurantisignatus Zajciw, 1964
- Mecometopus batesii (White, 1855)
- Mecometopus bicinctus Aurivillius, 1920
- Mecometopus cauaburi Martins & Galileo, 2011
- Mecometopus centurio Chevrolat, 1862
- Mecometopus curtus (Laporte & Gory, 1835)
- Mecometopus giesberti Chemsak & Noguera, 1993
- Mecometopus globicollis (Laporte & Gory, 1835)
- Mecometopus ion (Chevrolat, 1860)
- Mecometopus latithorax Martins & Galileo, 2008
- Mecometopus leprieuri (Laporte & Gory, 1835)
- Mecometopus melanion Bates, 1885
- Mecometopus mundus (Chevrolat, 1860)
- Mecometopus palmatus (Olivier, 1795)
- Mecometopus polygenus Thomson, 1860
- Mecometopus remipes Bates, 1885
- Mecometopus riveti Gounelle, 1910
- Mecometopus sarukhani Chemsak & Noguera, 1993
- Mecometopus triangularis (Laporte & Gory, 1835)
- Mecometopus wallacei (White, 1855)
