= Cotyclytus =

Scientific classification
- Domain: Eukaryota
- Kingdom: Animalia
- Phylum: Arthropoda
- Class: Insecta
- Order: Coleoptera
- Suborder: Polyphaga
- Infraorder: Cucujiformia
- Family: Cerambycidae
- Subfamily: Cerambycinae
- Tribe: Clytini
- Genus: Cotyclytus; Martins & Galileo, 2011

Genus of beetles

Cotyclytus is a genus of beetles in the family Cerambycidae, containing the following species:

- Cotyclytus amazonicus (Fuchs, 1975)
- Cotyclytus basalis (Chevrolat, 1862)
- Cotyclytus cristatus (Chevrolat, 1862)
- Cotyclytus curvatus (Germar, 1821)
- Cotyclytus discretus (Melzer, 1934)
- Cotyclytus distinctus (Zajciw, 1963)
- Cotyclytus dorsalis (Laporte & Gory, 1835)
- Cotyclytus lebasii (Chevrolat, 1862)
- Cotyclytus magicus (Perty, 1832)
- Cotyclytus niger (Aurivillius, 1920)
- Cotyclytus patagonicus (Bruch, 1911)
- Cotyclytus peruvianus (Schmid, 2009)
- Cotyclytus potiuna (Galileo & Martins, 2007)
- Cotyclytus regularis (Chevrolat, 1862)
- Cotyclytus scenicus (Pascoe, 1866)
- Cotyclytus sobrinus (Laporte & Gory, 1835)
- Cotyclytus stillatus (Aurivillius, 1908)
- Cotyclytus suturalis (Fuchs, 1963)
