= Calloides nobilis =

Scientific classification
- Kingdom: Animalia
- Phylum: Arthropoda
- Class: Insecta
- Order: Coleoptera
- Suborder: Polyphaga
- Infraorder: Cucujiformia
- Family: Cerambycidae
- Genus: Calloides
- Species: C. nobilis

Binomial name
- Calloides nobilis (Harris, 1837)

Species of beetle

Calloides nobilis is a species of beetle in the family Cerambycidae. It was described by Harris in 1837.
