= Cotyclytus peruvianus =

Scientific classification
- Domain: Eukaryota
- Kingdom: Animalia
- Phylum: Arthropoda
- Class: Insecta
- Order: Coleoptera
- Suborder: Polyphaga
- Infraorder: Cucujiformia
- Family: Cerambycidae
- Genus: Cotyclytus
- Species: C. peruvianus

Binomial name
- Cotyclytus peruvianus (Schmid, 2009)

Species of beetle

Cotyclytus peruvianus is a species of beetle in the family Cerambycidae. It was described by Schmid in 2009.
