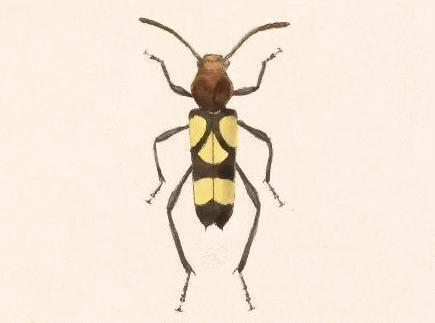

Scientific classification
- Kingdom: Animalia
- Phylum: Arthropoda
- Class: Insecta
- Order: Coleoptera
- Suborder: Polyphaga
- Infraorder: Cucujiformia
- Family: Cerambycidae
- Genus: Pirangoclytus
- Species: P. amaryllis

Binomial name
- Pirangoclytus amaryllis (Chevrolat, 1862)

= Pirangoclytus amaryllis =

Species of beetle

Pirangoclytus amaryllis is a species of beetle in the family Cerambycidae. It was described by Chevrolat in 1862.
