= Trichoxys abbreviatus =

Scientific classification
- Domain: Eukaryota
- Kingdom: Animalia
- Phylum: Arthropoda
- Class: Insecta
- Order: Coleoptera
- Suborder: Polyphaga
- Infraorder: Cucujiformia
- Family: Cerambycidae
- Genus: Trichoxys
- Species: T. abbreviatus

Binomial name
- Trichoxys abbreviatus Bates, 1880

Species of beetle

Trichoxys abbreviatus is a species of beetle in the family Cerambycidae. It was described by Bates in 1880.
