= Pirangoclytus mniszechii =

Scientific classification
- Kingdom: Animalia
- Phylum: Arthropoda
- Clade: Pancrustacea
- Class: Insecta
- Order: Coleoptera
- Suborder: Polyphaga
- Infraorder: Cucujiformia
- Family: Cerambycidae
- Genus: Pirangoclytus
- Species: P. mniszechii

Binomial name
- Pirangoclytus mniszechii (Chevrolat, 1862)

Species of beetle

Pirangoclytus mniszechii is a species of beetle in the family Cerambycidae. It was described by Chevrolat in 1862. It is found in Brazil (Minas Gerais, Espírito Santo, Rio de Janeiro, São Paulo, Paraná, Santa Catarina, Rio Grande do Sul), Paraguay and Argentina (Misiones).
