= Rhaphuma fulgurata =

Scientific classification
- Domain: Eukaryota
- Kingdom: Animalia
- Phylum: Arthropoda
- Class: Insecta
- Order: Coleoptera
- Suborder: Polyphaga
- Infraorder: Cucujiformia
- Family: Cerambycidae
- Genus: Rhaphuma
- Species: R. fulgurata

Binomial name
- Rhaphuma fulgurata Gahan, 1906

Species of beetle

Rhaphuma fulgurata is a species of longhorn beetle in the family Cerambycidae, found in southern Asia. This species has two subspecies, Rhaphuma fulgurata bhutanica Holzschuh, 2003, and Rhaphuma fulgurata fulgurata.
