= Miriclytus quadrifasciatus =

Scientific classification
- Kingdom: Animalia
- Phylum: Arthropoda
- Class: Insecta
- Order: Coleoptera
- Suborder: Polyphaga
- Infraorder: Cucujiformia
- Family: Cerambycidae
- Genus: Miriclytus
- Species: M. quadrifasciatus

Binomial name
- Miriclytus quadrifasciatus (Chevrolat, 1862)

Species of beetle

Miriclytus quadrifasciatus is a species of beetle in the family Cerambycidae. It was described by Chevrolat in 1862.
