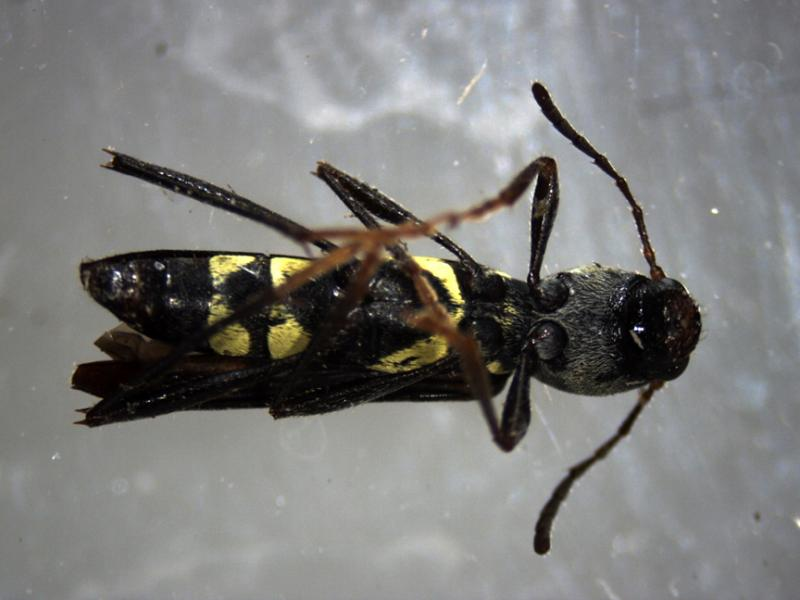

Scientific classification
- Kingdom: Animalia
- Phylum: Arthropoda
- Class: Insecta
- Order: Coleoptera
- Suborder: Polyphaga
- Infraorder: Cucujiformia
- Family: Cerambycidae
- Genus: Ayriclytus
- Species: A. macilentus

Binomial name
- Ayriclytus macilentus (Bates, 1872)

= Ayriclytus macilentus =

Species of beetle

Ayriclytus macilentus is a species of beetle in the family Cerambycidae. It was described by Bates in 1872.
