= Mecometopus centurio =

Scientific classification
- Kingdom: Animalia
- Phylum: Arthropoda
- Clade: Pancrustacea
- Class: Insecta
- Order: Coleoptera
- Suborder: Polyphaga
- Infraorder: Cucujiformia
- Family: Cerambycidae
- Genus: Mecometopus
- Species: M. centurio

Binomial name
- Mecometopus centurio (Chevrolat, 1860)

Species of beetle

Mecometopus centurio is a species of beetle in the family Cerambycidae. It was described by Chevrolat in 1860. It is found in Brazil (Goiás, Bahia, Minas Gerais, Espírito Santo, Rio de Janeiro, São Paulo, Paraná, Santa Catarina, Rio Grande do Sul), Paraguay, Argentina (Misiones) and Uruguay.
