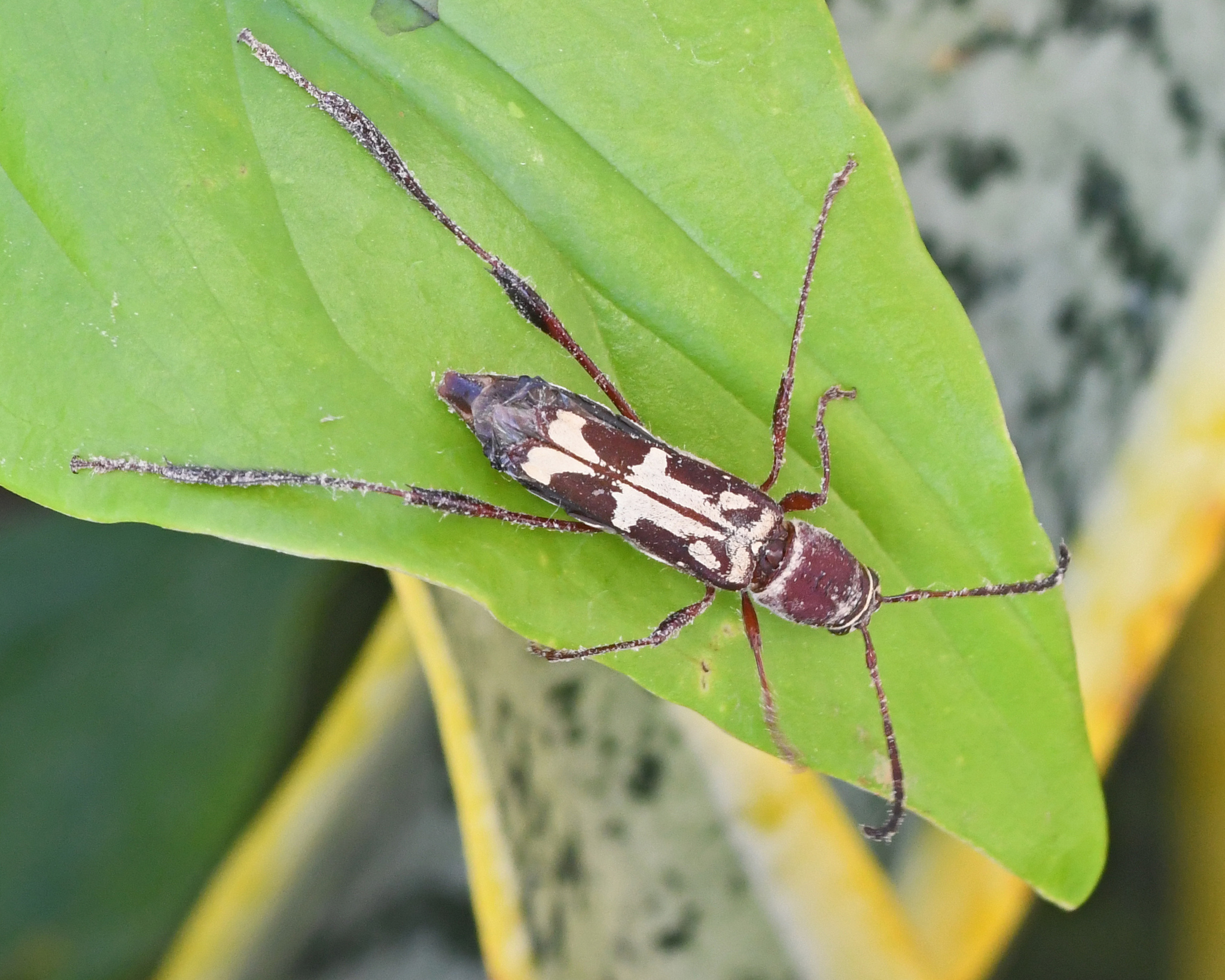

Scientific classification
- Kingdom: Animalia
- Phylum: Arthropoda
- Class: Insecta
- Order: Coleoptera
- Suborder: Polyphaga
- Infraorder: Cucujiformia
- Family: Cerambycidae
- Subfamily: Cerambycinae
- Tribe: Clytini
- Genus: Euryscelis; Dejean, 1835
- Species: E. suturalis

Binomial name
- Euryscelis suturalis (Olivier, 1795)

= Euryscelis =

Genus of beetles

Euryscelis suturalis is a species of beetle in the family Cerambycidae, the only species in the genus Euryscelis.
