= Calloides =

Scientific classification
- Kingdom: Animalia
- Phylum: Arthropoda
- Class: Insecta
- Order: Coleoptera
- Suborder: Polyphaga
- Infraorder: Cucujiformia
- Family: Cerambycidae
- Tribe: Clytini
- Genus: Calloides

Genus of beetles

Calloides is a genus of beetles in the family Cerambycidae, containing the following species:

- Calloides lorquini (Buquet, 1859)
- Calloides nobilis (Harris, 1837)
- Calloides regalis (Chevrolat, 1860)
