= Cotyclytus stillatus =

Scientific classification
- Domain: Eukaryota
- Kingdom: Animalia
- Phylum: Arthropoda
- Class: Insecta
- Order: Coleoptera
- Suborder: Polyphaga
- Infraorder: Cucujiformia
- Family: Cerambycidae
- Genus: Cotyclytus
- Species: C. stillatus

Binomial name
- Cotyclytus stillatus (Aurivillius, 1908)

Species of beetle

Cotyclytus stillatus is a species of beetle in the family Cerambycidae. It was described by Per Olof Christopher Aurivillius in 1908.
