= Ygapema delicata =

Scientific classification
- Kingdom: Animalia
- Phylum: Arthropoda
- Clade: Pancrustacea
- Class: Insecta
- Order: Coleoptera
- Suborder: Polyphaga
- Infraorder: Cucujiformia
- Family: Cerambycidae
- Genus: Ygapema
- Species: Y. delicata

Binomial name
- Ygapema delicata (Gounelle, 1911)

Species of beetle

Ygapema delicata is a species of beetle in the family Cerambycidae. It was described by French entomologist and naturalist Pierre-Émile Gounelle in 1911. It is found in Brazil (Goiás, Pernambuco, Bahia, Minas Gerais, Espírito Santo, Rio de Janeiro, São Paulo, Paraná, Santa Catarina), Argentina (Misiones) and Uruguay.
