= Petraphuma =

Scientific classification
- Kingdom: Animalia
- Phylum: Arthropoda
- Clade: Pancrustacea
- Class: Insecta
- Order: Coleoptera
- Suborder: Polyphaga
- Infraorder: Cucujiformia
- Family: Cerambycidae
- Tribe: Clytini
- Genus: Petraphuma; Viktora, 2018

Genus of beetles

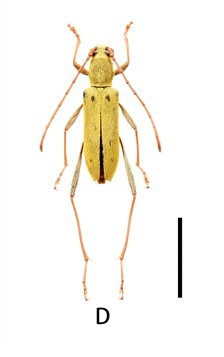
Petraphuma boreolaosica female

Petraphuma is a genus of beetles in the family Cerambycidae, containing the following species:

- Petraphuma allegoria (Viktora & Tichý, 2017)
- Petraphuma amelia Gouverneur, 2021
- Petraphuma boreolaosica (Viktora & Tichý, 2017)
- Petraphuma boreovietnamica (Viktora & Tichý, 2017)
- Petraphuma cerevisia Viktora, 2021
- Petraphuma huangjianbini Viktora & Liu, 2018
- Petraphuma meridiosinica (Viktora & Tichý, 2017)
- Petraphuma meridiovietnamica (Viktora & Tichý, 2017)
- Petraphuma pictura Viktora, 2022
- Petraphuma pompa Viktora & Liu, 2018
- Petraphuma sulphurea (Gressitt, 1941)
