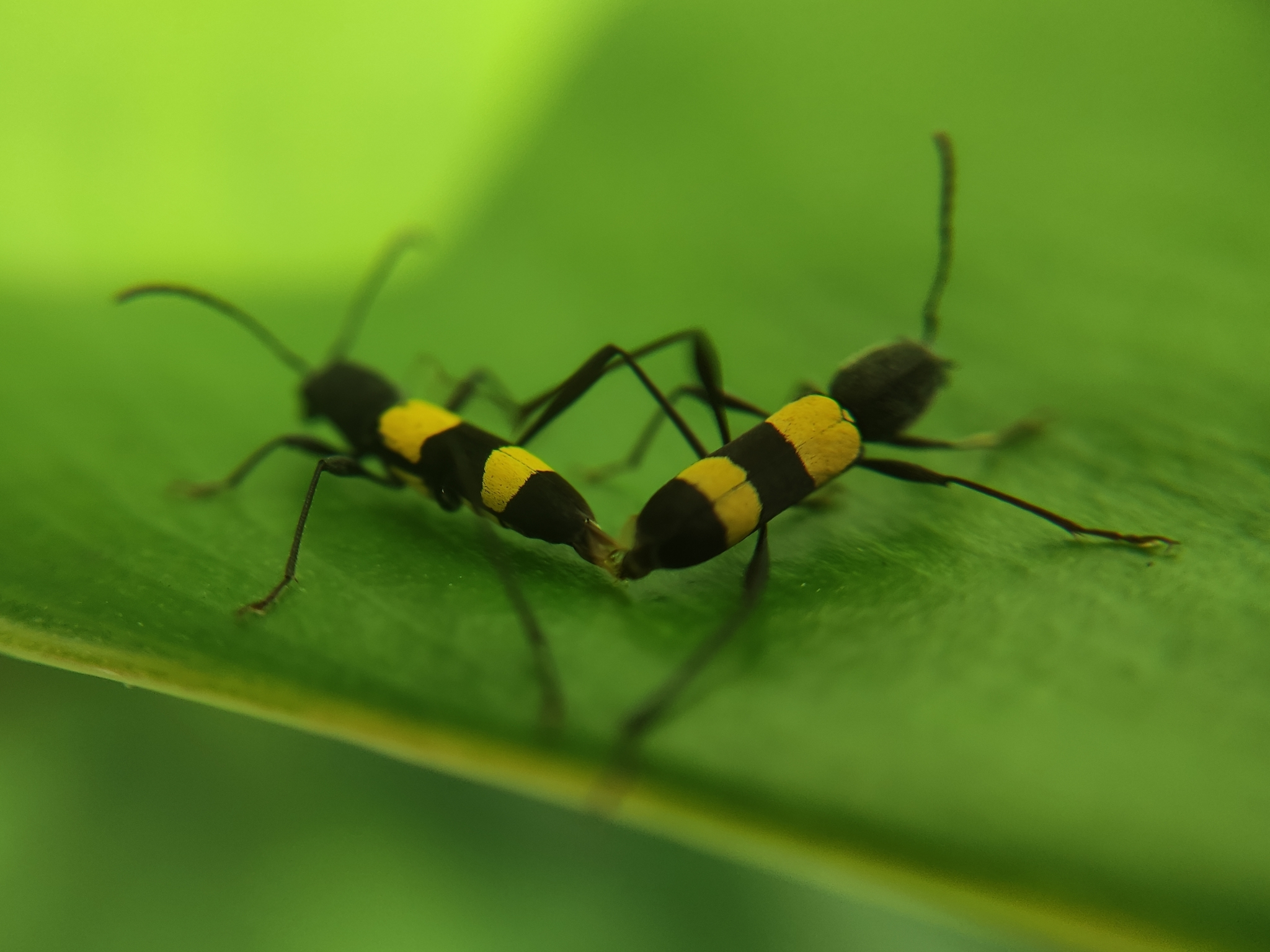

Scientific classification
- Kingdom: Animalia
- Phylum: Arthropoda
- Clade: Pancrustacea
- Class: Insecta
- Order: Coleoptera
- Suborder: Polyphaga
- Infraorder: Cucujiformia
- Family: Cerambycidae
- Genus: Mecometopus
- Species: M. bicinctus

Binomial name
- Mecometopus bicinctus Aurivillius, 1920

= Mecometopus bicinctus =

Species of beetle

Mecometopus bicinctus is a species of beetle in the family Cerambycidae. It was described by Per Olof Christopher Aurivillius in 1920. It is also extremely poisonous.
