= Ygapema errata =

Scientific classification
- Kingdom: Animalia
- Phylum: Arthropoda
- Class: Insecta
- Order: Coleoptera
- Suborder: Polyphaga
- Infraorder: Cucujiformia
- Family: Cerambycidae
- Genus: Ygapema
- Species: Y. errata

Binomial name
- Ygapema errata (Martins & Galileo, 2008)

Species of beetle

Ygapema errata is a species of beetle in the family Cerambycidae. It was described by Martins and Galileo in 2008.
