= Amyipunga barbarae =

Scientific classification
- Domain: Eukaryota
- Kingdom: Animalia
- Phylum: Arthropoda
- Class: Insecta
- Order: Coleoptera
- Suborder: Polyphaga
- Infraorder: Cucujiformia
- Family: Cerambycidae
- Genus: Amyipunga
- Species: A. barbarae

Binomial name
- Amyipunga barbarae Schmid, 2011

Species of beetle

Amyipunga barbarae is a species of beetle in the family Cerambycidae. It was described by Schmid in 2011.
