= Trichoxys =

Scientific classification
- Domain: Eukaryota
- Kingdom: Animalia
- Phylum: Arthropoda
- Class: Insecta
- Order: Coleoptera
- Suborder: Polyphaga
- Infraorder: Cucujiformia
- Family: Cerambycidae
- Tribe: Clytini
- Genus: Trichoxys

Genus of beetles

Trichoxys is a genus of beetles in the family Cerambycidae, containing the following species:

- Trichoxys abbreviatus Bates, 1880
- Trichoxys apelles (Newman, 1838)
- Trichoxys atripes (Chevrolat, 1860)
- Trichoxys bilineatus (Chevrolat, 1860)
- Trichoxys hirtellus (Chevrolat, 1860)
- Trichoxys labyrinthicus (Chevrolat, 1860)
- Trichoxys longipes Chemsak & Linsley, 1974
- Trichoxys melanotelus (White, 1855)
- Trichoxys ochraetheoides Linsley, 1935
- Trichoxys pellitus (White, 1855)
- Trichoxys rubripes (White, 1855)
- Trichoxys sulphurifer (Chevrolat, 1860)
- Trichoxys viridicollis (Chevrolat, 1860)
- Trichoxys vitticollis (Laporte & Gory, 1835)
- Trichoxys westwoodii (Chevrolat, 1860)
