= Mecometopus riveti =

Scientific classification
- Domain: Eukaryota
- Kingdom: Animalia
- Phylum: Arthropoda
- Class: Insecta
- Order: Coleoptera
- Suborder: Polyphaga
- Infraorder: Cucujiformia
- Family: Cerambycidae
- Genus: Mecometopus
- Species: M. riveti

Binomial name
- Mecometopus riveti Gounelle, 1910

Species of beetle

Mecometopus riveti is a species of beetle in the family Cerambycidae. It was described by Gounelle in 1910.
