= Ygapema michelleae =

Scientific classification
- Kingdom: Animalia
- Phylum: Arthropoda
- Class: Insecta
- Order: Coleoptera
- Suborder: Polyphaga
- Infraorder: Cucujiformia
- Family: Cerambycidae
- Genus: Ygapema
- Species: Y. michelleae

Binomial name
- Ygapema michelleae Schmid, 2011

Species of beetle

Ygapema michelleae is a species of beetle in the family Cerambycidae. It was described by Schmid in 2011.
