= Unaiuba ludicrus =

Scientific classification
- Kingdom: Animalia
- Phylum: Arthropoda
- Class: Insecta
- Order: Coleoptera
- Suborder: Polyphaga
- Infraorder: Cucujiformia
- Family: Cerambycidae
- Genus: Unaiuba
- Species: U. ludicrus

Binomial name
- Unaiuba ludicrus (Melzer, 1934)

Species of beetle

Unaiuba ludicrus is a species of beetle in the family Cerambycidae. It was described by Melzer in 1934.
