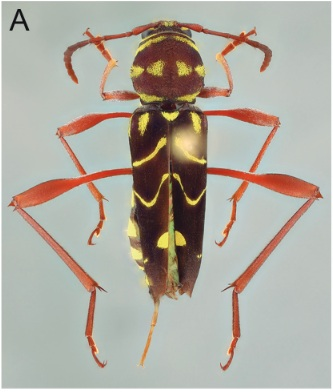

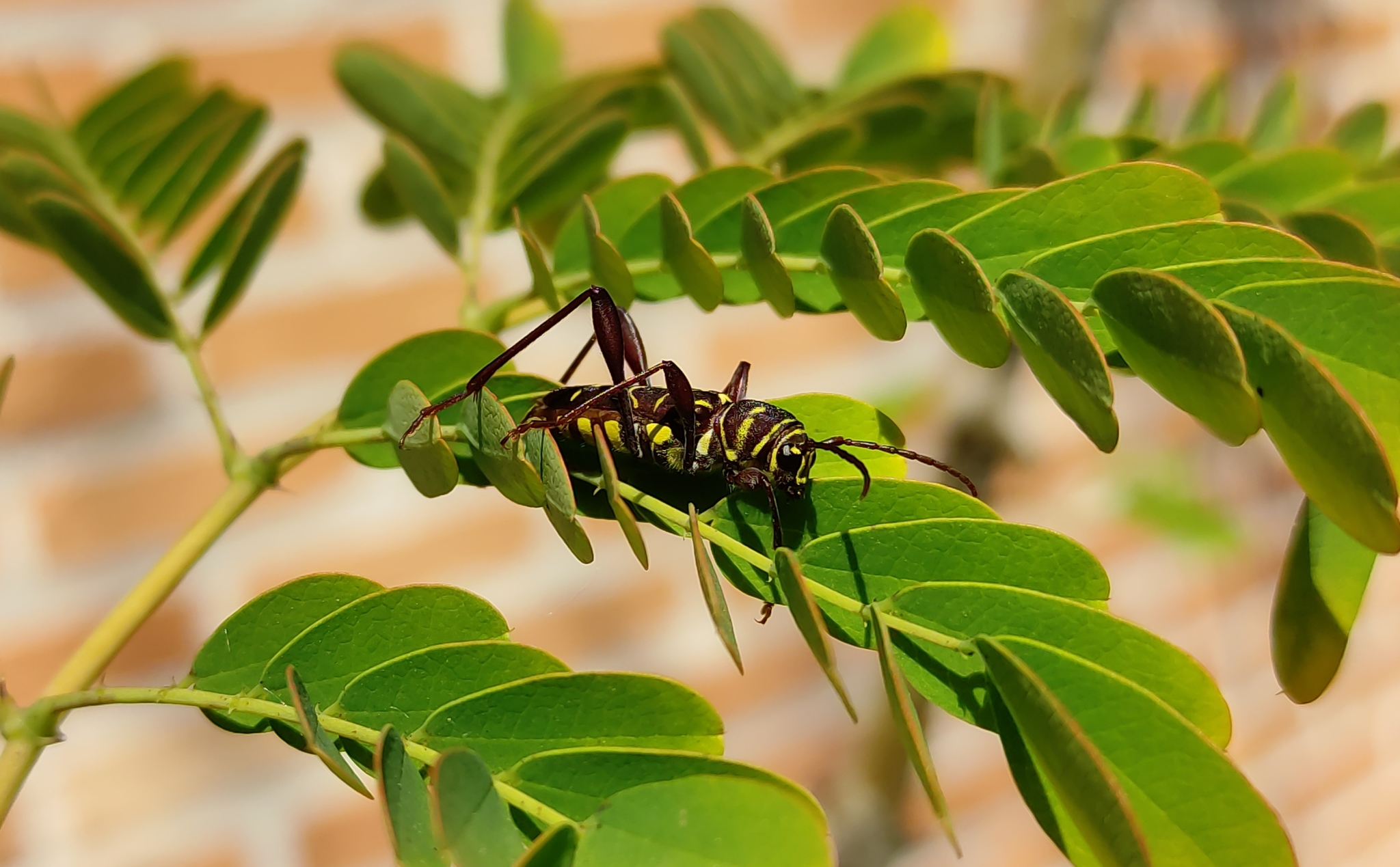

Scientific classification
- Kingdom: Animalia
- Phylum: Arthropoda
- Clade: Pancrustacea
- Class: Insecta
- Order: Coleoptera
- Suborder: Polyphaga
- Infraorder: Cucujiformia
- Family: Cerambycidae
- Genus: Cotyclytus
- Species: C. curvatus

Binomial name
- Cotyclytus curvatus (Germar, 1821)

Synonyms
- Clytus curvatus Germar, 1821

= Cotyclytus curvatus =

Species of beetle

Cotyclytus curvatus is a species of beetle in the family Cerambycidae. It was described by Ernst Friedrich Germar in 1821. It is found in Brazil, Paraguay, Argentina and Uruguay.
