= Miriclytus miri =

Scientific classification
- Kingdom: Animalia
- Phylum: Arthropoda
- Class: Insecta
- Order: Coleoptera
- Suborder: Polyphaga
- Infraorder: Cucujiformia
- Family: Cerambycidae
- Genus: Miriclytus
- Species: M. miri

Binomial name
- Miriclytus miri (Galileo & Martins, 2007)

Species of beetle

Miriclytus miri is a species of beetle in the family Cerambycidae. It was described by Galileo and Martins in 2007.
