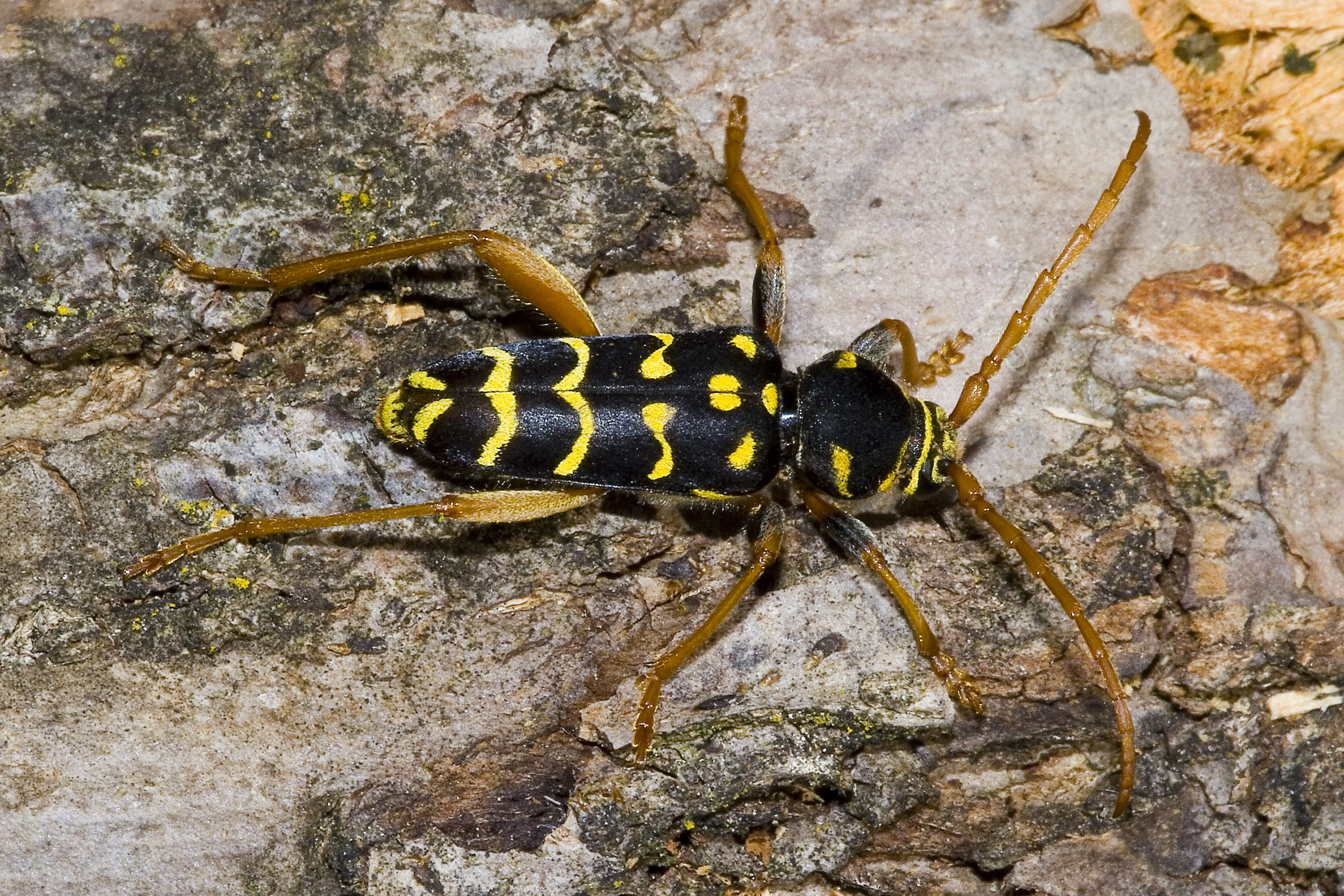

Conservation status
- Least Concern (IUCN 3.1)

Scientific classification
- Kingdom: Animalia
- Phylum: Arthropoda
- Class: Insecta
- Order: Coleoptera
- Suborder: Polyphaga
- Infraorder: Cucujiformia
- Family: Cerambycidae
- Genus: Plagionotus
- Species: P. arcuatus

Binomial name
- Plagionotus arcuatus (Linnaeus, 1758)

= Plagionotus arcuatus =

Species of beetle

Plagionotus arcuatus is a species of beetle in the family Cerambycidae. It exhibits Batesian mimicry, visually resembling a wasp of the genus Vespula.

== Taxonomy ==
Plagionotus arcuatus contains the following varieties/subspecies:

- Plagionotus arcuatus var. descarpentriesi
- Plagionotus arcuatus var. pseudoreichei
- Plagionotus arcuatus var. stupidus
- Plagionotus arcuatus ghidottii Pesarini & Sabbadini, 2011
- Plagionotus arcuatus kirgizicus Lazarev, 2010
- Plagionotus arcuatus lugubris (Ménétriés, 1832)
- Plagionotus arcuatus multiinterruptus Pic, 1933
- Plagionotus arcuatus shirazensis Królik et al., 2021
