= Cotyclytus suturalis =

Scientific classification
- Domain: Eukaryota
- Kingdom: Animalia
- Phylum: Arthropoda
- Class: Insecta
- Order: Coleoptera
- Suborder: Polyphaga
- Infraorder: Cucujiformia
- Family: Cerambycidae
- Genus: Cotyclytus
- Species: C. suturalis

Binomial name
- Cotyclytus suturalis (E. Fuchs, 1963)

Species of beetle

Cotyclytus suturalis is a species of beetle in the family Cerambycidae. It was described by Ernst Fuchs in 1963.
