= Amyipunga canescens =

Scientific classification
- Domain: Eukaryota
- Kingdom: Animalia
- Phylum: Arthropoda
- Class: Insecta
- Order: Coleoptera
- Suborder: Polyphaga
- Infraorder: Cucujiformia
- Family: Cerambycidae
- Genus: Amyipunga
- Species: A. canescens

Binomial name
- Amyipunga canescens (Martins & Galileo, 2005)

Species of beetle

Amyipunga canescens is a species of beetle in the family Cerambycidae. It was described by Martins and Galileo in 2005.
