= Cotyclytus amazonicus =

Scientific classification
- Domain: Eukaryota
- Kingdom: Animalia
- Phylum: Arthropoda
- Class: Insecta
- Order: Coleoptera
- Suborder: Polyphaga
- Infraorder: Cucujiformia
- Family: Cerambycidae
- Genus: Cotyclytus
- Species: C. amazonicus

Binomial name
- Cotyclytus amazonicus (E. Fuchs, 1975)

Species of beetle

Cotyclytus amazonicus is a species of beetle in the family Cerambycidae. It was described by Ernst Fuchs in 1975.
