= Unaiuba aulai =

Scientific classification
- Kingdom: Animalia
- Phylum: Arthropoda
- Class: Insecta
- Order: Coleoptera
- Suborder: Polyphaga
- Infraorder: Cucujiformia
- Family: Cerambycidae
- Genus: Unaiuba
- Species: U. aulai

Binomial name
- Unaiuba aulai (Bruch, 1911)

Species of beetle

Unaiuba aulai is a species of beetle in the family Cerambycidae. It was described by Bruch in 1911.
