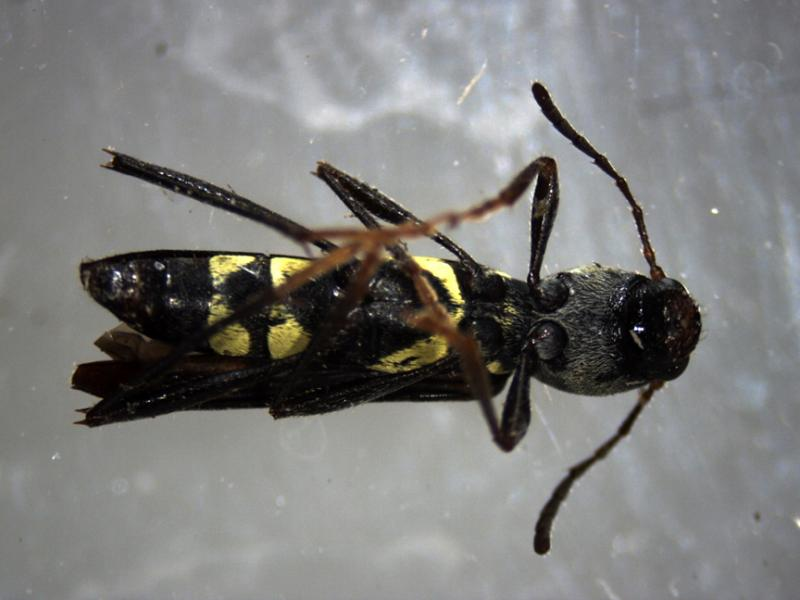
- Ayriclytus macilentus

Scientific classification
- Kingdom: Animalia
- Phylum: Arthropoda
- Class: Insecta
- Order: Coleoptera
- Suborder: Polyphaga
- Infraorder: Cucujiformia
- Family: Cerambycidae
- Subfamily: Cerambycinae
- Tribe: Clytini
- Genus: Ayriclytus; Martins & Galileo 2011

= Ayriclytus =

Genus of beetles

Ayriclytus is a genus of beetles in the family Cerambycidae, containing the following species:

- Ayriclytus bolivianus Martins & Galileo, 2011
- Ayriclytus gracilis (Zajciw, 1958)
- Ayriclytus macilentus (Bates, 1872)
- Ayriclytus simoni (Lameere, 1893)
