= Unaiuba =

Scientific classification
- Domain: Eukaryota
- Kingdom: Animalia
- Phylum: Arthropoda
- Class: Insecta
- Order: Coleoptera
- Suborder: Polyphaga
- Infraorder: Cucujiformia
- Family: Cerambycidae
- Tribe: Clytini
- Genus: Unaiuba; Martins & Galileo, 2011

Genus of beetles

Unaiuba is a genus of beetles in the family Cerambycidae, first described by Ubirajara Ribeiro Martins and Maria Helena Mainieri Galileo in 2011.

== Species ==
Unaiuba contains the following species:

- Unaiuba aulai (Bruch, 1911)
- Unaiuba beltiana (Bates, 1885)
- Unaiuba bruchi (Melzer, 1927)
- Unaiuba catarina (Napp & Monne, 2006)
- Unaiuba flava Martins & Galileo, 2011
- Unaiuba giesberti (Chemsak & Noguera, 1993)
- Unaiuba icterica (Gounelle, 1911)
- Unaiuba ion (Chevrolat, 1860)
- Unaiuba ludicrus (Melzer, 1934)
- Unaiuba m-fasciata Schmid, 2015
- Unaiuba pinima (Galileo & Martins, 2007)
- Unaiuba sarukhani (Chemsak & Noguera, 1993)
- Unaiuba vitellina (Martins & Galileo, 2008)
- Unaiuba vitticollis (Aurivillius, 1920)
- Unaiuba zonata (Martins & Galileo, 2008)
