= Amyipunga armaticollis =

Scientific classification
- Domain: Eukaryota
- Kingdom: Animalia
- Phylum: Arthropoda
- Class: Insecta
- Order: Coleoptera
- Suborder: Polyphaga
- Infraorder: Cucujiformia
- Family: Cerambycidae
- Genus: Amyipunga
- Species: A. armaticollis

Binomial name
- Amyipunga armaticollis (Zajciw, 1964)

Species of beetle

Amyipunga armaticollis is a species of beetle in the family Cerambycidae. It was described by Zajciw in 1964.
