= Dexithea =

Scientific classification
- Kingdom: Animalia
- Phylum: Arthropoda
- Class: Insecta
- Order: Coleoptera
- Suborder: Polyphaga
- Infraorder: Cucujiformia
- Family: Cerambycidae
- Tribe: Clytini
- Genus: Dexithea

Genus of beetles

Dexithea is a genus of beetles in the family Cerambycidae, containing the following species:

- Dexithea fabricii (Chevrolat, 1860)
- Dexithea humeralis Chemsak & Noguera, 2001
- Dexithea klugii (Laporte & Gory, 1835)
