= Mecometopus latithorax =

Scientific classification
- Domain: Eukaryota
- Kingdom: Animalia
- Phylum: Arthropoda
- Class: Insecta
- Order: Coleoptera
- Suborder: Polyphaga
- Infraorder: Cucujiformia
- Family: Cerambycidae
- Genus: Mecometopus
- Species: M. latithorax

Binomial name
- Mecometopus latithorax Martins & Galileo, 2008

Species of beetle

Mecometopus latithorax is a species of beetle in the family Cerambycidae. It was described by Martins and Galileo in 2008.
