= Pirangoclytus granulipennis =

Scientific classification
- Kingdom: Animalia
- Phylum: Arthropoda
- Class: Insecta
- Order: Coleoptera
- Suborder: Polyphaga
- Infraorder: Cucujiformia
- Family: Cerambycidae
- Genus: Pirangoclytus
- Species: P. granulipennis

Binomial name
- Pirangoclytus granulipennis (Zajciw, 1963)

Species of beetle

Pirangoclytus granulipennis is a species of beetle in the family Cerambycidae. It was described by Zajciw in 1963.
