= Amyipunga =

Scientific classification
- Domain: Eukaryota
- Kingdom: Animalia
- Phylum: Arthropoda
- Class: Insecta
- Order: Coleoptera
- Suborder: Polyphaga
- Infraorder: Cucujiformia
- Family: Cerambycidae
- Tribe: Clytini
- Genus: Amyipunga

Genus of beetles

Amyipunga is a genus of beetles in the family Cerambycidae, containing the following species:

- Amyipunga armaticollis (Zajciw, 1964)
- Amyipunga barbarae Schmid, 2011
- Amyipunga canescens (Martins & Galileo, 2005)
- Amyipunga moritzii (Thomson, 1860)
