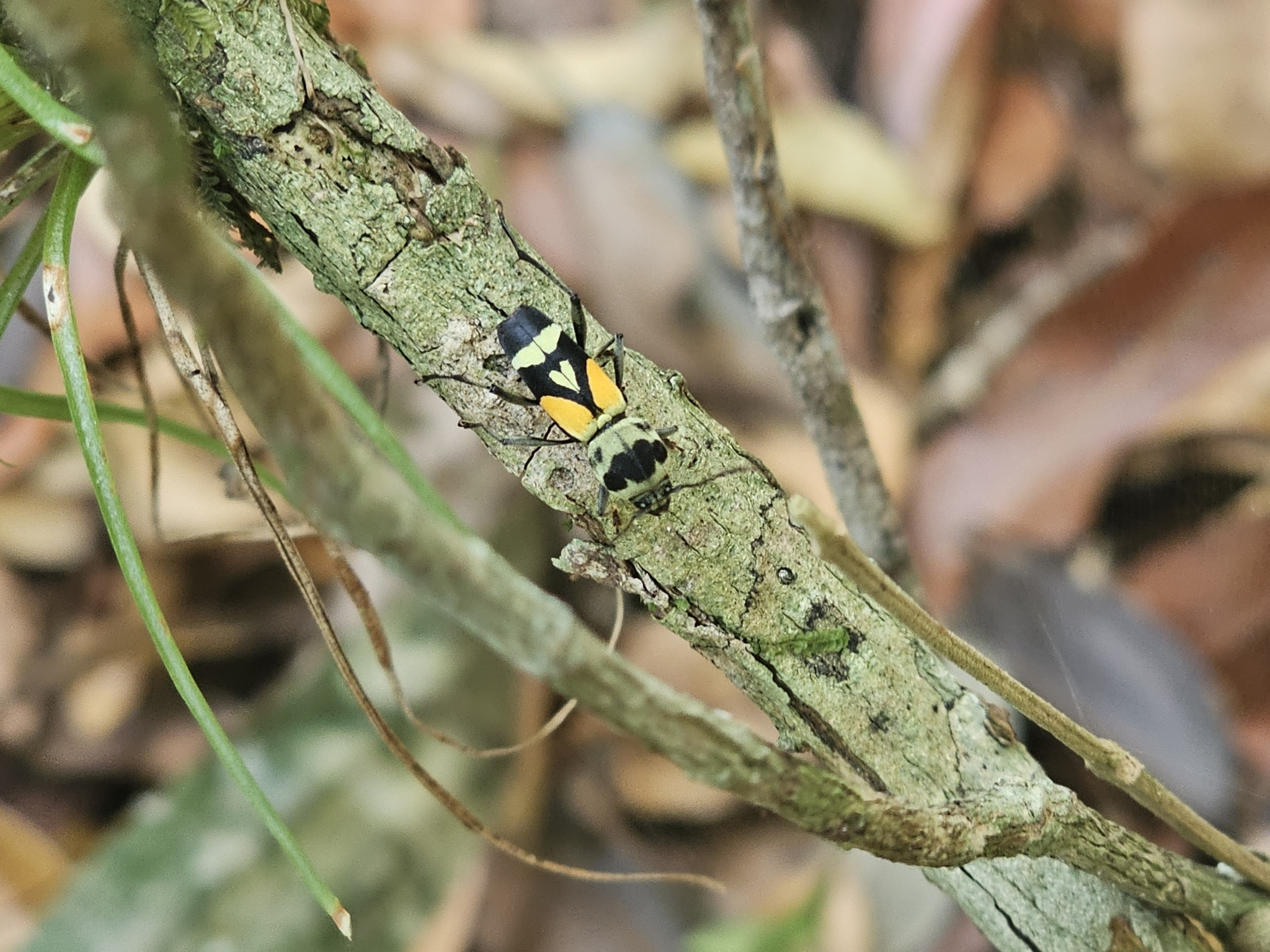

Scientific classification
- Kingdom: Animalia
- Phylum: Arthropoda
- Class: Insecta
- Order: Coleoptera
- Suborder: Polyphaga
- Infraorder: Cucujiformia
- Family: Cerambycidae
- Genus: Mecometopus
- Species: M. aurantisignatus

Binomial name
- Mecometopus aurantisignatus Zajciw, 1964

= Mecometopus aurantisignatus =

Species of beetle

Mecometopus aurantisignatus is a species of beetle in the family Cerambycidae. It was described by Zajciw in 1964.
