= Pirangoclytus nubicollis =

Scientific classification
- Kingdom: Animalia
- Phylum: Arthropoda
- Class: Insecta
- Order: Coleoptera
- Suborder: Polyphaga
- Infraorder: Cucujiformia
- Family: Cerambycidae
- Genus: Pirangoclytus
- Species: P. nubicollis

Binomial name
- Pirangoclytus nubicollis (Zajciw, 1964)

Species of beetle

Pirangoclytus nubicollis is a species of beetle in the family Cerambycidae. It was described by Zajciw in 1964.
