= Pirangoclytus =

Scientific classification
- Kingdom: Animalia
- Phylum: Arthropoda
- Clade: Pancrustacea
- Class: Insecta
- Order: Coleoptera
- Suborder: Polyphaga
- Infraorder: Cucujiformia
- Family: Cerambycidae
- Subfamily: Cerambycinae
- Tribe: Clytini
- Genus: Pirangoclytus; Martins & Galileo, 2011

Genus of beetles

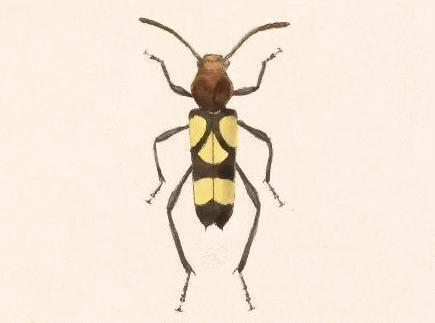

Pirangoclytus is a genus of beetles in the family Cerambycidae, containing the following species:

- Pirangoclytus amaryllis (Chevrolat, 1862)
- Pirangoclytus chaparensis Martins & Galileo, 2011
- Pirangoclytus flavius (Bates, 1870)
- Pirangoclytus fraternus Martins & Galileo, 2011
- Pirangoclytus granulipennis (Zajciw, 1963)
- Pirangoclytus insignis (Chevrolat, 1862)
- Pirangoclytus jauffreti Martins & Galileo, 2011
- Pirangoclytus laetus (Fabricius, 1801)
- Pirangoclytus latecinctus (Bates, 1870)
- Pirangoclytus mendosus (Galileo & Martins, 1996)
- Pirangoclytus mniszechii (Chevrolat, 1862)
- Pirangoclytus nubicollis (Zajciw, 1964)
- Pirangoclytus placens (Chevrolat, 1862)
- Pirangoclytus purus (Bates, 1870)
- Pirangoclytus rhinotragoides (Thomson, 1860)
- Pirangoclytus rubefactus (Bates, 1870)
- Pirangoclytus sulphurosus (Di Iorio, 2006)
- Pirangoclytus ycoca (Galileo & Martins, 2007)
