= Megacheuma =

Megacheuma brevipenne

Scientific classification
- Kingdom: Animalia
- Phylum: Arthropoda
- Class: Insecta
- Order: Coleoptera
- Suborder: Polyphaga
- Infraorder: Cucujiformia
- Family: Cerambycidae
- Tribe: Clytini
- Genus: Megacheuma; Mickel, 1919
- Species: M. brevipenne

Binomial name
- Megacheuma brevipenne (LeConte, 1873)

Synonyms
- Cyllene brevipennis LeConte, 1873; Megacheuma melanosticum Mickel, 1919; Megacheuma brevipennis Auctt. (Missp.); Megacheuma brevipennis [sic] tiemanni Hovore, 1979

Genus of beetles

Megacheuma brevipenne is a species of beetle in the family Cerambycidae, the only species in the genus Megacheuma. The name is often misspelled as brevipennis (e.g.,). It occurs throughout the Great Basin of California, Nevada, Oregon, Utah, and Wyoming, where it feeds on the roots of greasewood (Sarcobatus vermiculatus) and saltbush (Atriplex).
