= Calloides regalis =

Scientific classification
- Kingdom: Animalia
- Phylum: Arthropoda
- Class: Insecta
- Order: Coleoptera
- Suborder: Polyphaga
- Infraorder: Cucujiformia
- Family: Cerambycidae
- Genus: Calloides
- Species: C. regalis

Binomial name
- Calloides regalis (Chevrolat, 1860)

Species of beetle

Calloides regalis is a species of beetle in the family Cerambycidae. It was described by Chevrolat in 1860.
