= Unaiuba flava =

Scientific classification
- Kingdom: Animalia
- Phylum: Arthropoda
- Class: Insecta
- Order: Coleoptera
- Suborder: Polyphaga
- Infraorder: Cucujiformia
- Family: Cerambycidae
- Genus: Unaiuba
- Species: U. flava

Binomial name
- Unaiuba flava Martins & Galileo, 2011

Species of beetle

Unaiuba flava is a species of beetle in the family Cerambycidae. It was described by Martins and Galileo in 2011.
