= Rostroclytus rondonianus =

Scientific classification
- Domain: Eukaryota
- Kingdom: Animalia
- Phylum: Arthropoda
- Class: Insecta
- Order: Coleoptera
- Suborder: Polyphaga
- Infraorder: Cucujiformia
- Family: Cerambycidae
- Genus: Rostroclytus
- Species: R. rondonianus

Binomial name
- Rostroclytus rondonianus (Napp & Monne, 2006)

Species of beetle

Rostroclytus rondonianus is a species of beetle in the family Cerambycidae. It was described by Napp and Monne in 2006.
