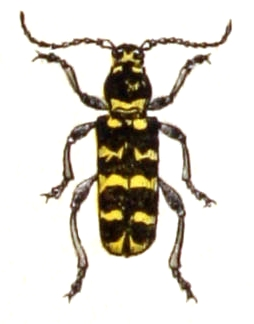
- Plagionotus floralis

Scientific classification
- Domain: Eukaryota
- Kingdom: Animalia
- Phylum: Arthropoda
- Class: Insecta
- Order: Coleoptera
- Suborder: Polyphaga
- Infraorder: Cucujiformia
- Family: Cerambycidae
- Tribe: Clytini
- Genus: Plagionotus; Mulsant, 1842

Species
- ~7 species

Synonyms
- Platynotus Mulsant, 1839: 71 [HN]; Type species: Leptura detrita Linnaeus, 1758

= Plagionotus =

Genus of beetles

Plagionotus is a genus of beetle in the family Cerambycidae, distributed primarily in the Old World, with only one species found in the New World, Plagionotus astecus.

== Species ==
- Plagionotus arcuatus (Linné, 1758)
  - Plagionotus arcuatus ghidottii Pesarini & Sabbadini, 2011
  - Plagionotus arcuatus kirgizicus Lazarev, 2010
  - Plagionotus arcuatus lugubris (Ménétriés, 1832)
  - Plagionotus arcuatus multiinterruptus Pic, 1933
  - Plagionotus arcuatus shirazensis Królik & al., 2021
- Plagionotus bartholomei (Motschulsky, 1859)
- Plagionotus bieberi (Bodemeyer, 1927)
- Plagionotus bisbifasciatus Pic, 1915
- Plagionotus christophi (Kraatz, 1879)
- Plagionotus detritus (Linné, 1758)
  - Plagionotus detritus africaeseptentrionalis Tippmann, 1952
  - Plagionotus detritus caucasicola Plavilstshikov, 1940
  - Plagionotus detritus cebecii Rapuzzi & Sama, 2018
  - Plagionotus detritus graecus Vartanis, 2023
- Plagionotus pulcher (Blessig, 1872)
