= Plagionotus astecus =

Scientific classification
- Kingdom: Animalia
- Phylum: Arthropoda
- Class: Insecta
- Order: Coleoptera
- Suborder: Polyphaga
- Infraorder: Cucujiformia
- Family: Cerambycidae
- Genus: Plagionotus
- Species: P. astecus

Binomial name
- Plagionotus astecus (Chevrolat, 1860)

Species of beetle

Plagionotus astecus is a species of beetle in the family Cerambycidae, the only species in the genus Plagionotus found in the New World.
