= Cotyclytus niger =

Scientific classification
- Domain: Eukaryota
- Kingdom: Animalia
- Phylum: Arthropoda
- Class: Insecta
- Order: Coleoptera
- Suborder: Polyphaga
- Infraorder: Cucujiformia
- Family: Cerambycidae
- Genus: Cotyclytus
- Species: C. niger

Binomial name
- Cotyclytus niger (Aurivillius, 1920)

Species of beetle

Cotyclytus niger is a species of beetle in the family Cerambycidae. It was described by Per Olof Christopher Aurivillius in 1920.
