= Itaclytus olivaceus =

Scientific classification
- Kingdom: Animalia
- Phylum: Arthropoda
- Class: Insecta
- Order: Coleoptera
- Suborder: Polyphaga
- Infraorder: Cucujiformia
- Family: Cerambycidae
- Genus: Itaclytus
- Species: I. olivaceus

Binomial name
- Itaclytus olivaceus (Castelnau & Gory, 1841)

Species of beetle

Itaclytus olivaceus is a species of beetle in the family Cerambycidae. It was described by Laporte de Castelnau and Gory in 1835.
