= Miriclytus =

Scientific classification
- Kingdom: Animalia
- Phylum: Arthropoda
- Class: Insecta
- Order: Coleoptera
- Suborder: Polyphaga
- Infraorder: Cucujiformia
- Family: Cerambycidae
- Tribe: Clytini
- Genus: Miriclytus

Genus of beetles

Miriclytus is a genus of beetles in the family Cerambycidae, containing the following species:

- Miriclytus miri (Galileo & Martins, 2007)
- Miriclytus quadrifasciatus (Chevrolat, 1862)
- Miriclytus triangularis Martins & Galileo, 2011
