= Ygapema accentifer =

Scientific classification
- Kingdom: Animalia
- Phylum: Arthropoda
- Class: Insecta
- Order: Coleoptera
- Suborder: Polyphaga
- Infraorder: Cucujiformia
- Family: Cerambycidae
- Genus: Ygapema
- Species: Y. accentifer

Binomial name
- Ygapema accentifer (Gounelle, 1910)

Species of beetle

Ygapema accentifer is a species of beetle in the family Cerambycidae. It was described by Gounelle in 1910.
