= Ygapema boliviana =

Scientific classification
- Kingdom: Animalia
- Phylum: Arthropoda
- Class: Insecta
- Order: Coleoptera
- Suborder: Polyphaga
- Infraorder: Cucujiformia
- Family: Cerambycidae
- Genus: Ygapema
- Species: Y. boliviana

Binomial name
- Ygapema boliviana (Belon, 1899)

Species of beetle

Ygapema boliviana is a species of beetle in the family Cerambycidae. It was described by Belon in 1899.
