= Trichoxys ochraetheoides =

Scientific classification
- Domain: Eukaryota
- Kingdom: Animalia
- Phylum: Arthropoda
- Class: Insecta
- Order: Coleoptera
- Suborder: Polyphaga
- Infraorder: Cucujiformia
- Family: Cerambycidae
- Genus: Trichoxys
- Species: T. ochraetheoides

Binomial name
- Trichoxys ochraetheoides Linsley, 1935

Species of beetle

Trichoxys ochraetheoides is a species of beetle in the family Cerambycidae. It was described by Linsley in 1935.
