= Pirangoclytus fraternus =

Scientific classification
- Kingdom: Animalia
- Phylum: Arthropoda
- Class: Insecta
- Order: Coleoptera
- Suborder: Polyphaga
- Infraorder: Cucujiformia
- Family: Cerambycidae
- Genus: Pirangoclytus
- Species: P. fraternus

Binomial name
- Pirangoclytus fraternus Martins & Galileo, 2011

Species of beetle

Pirangoclytus fraternus is a species of beetle in the family Cerambycidae. It was described by Martins and Galileo in 2011.
