= Cotyclytus distinctus =

Scientific classification
- Domain: Eukaryota
- Kingdom: Animalia
- Phylum: Arthropoda
- Class: Insecta
- Order: Coleoptera
- Suborder: Polyphaga
- Infraorder: Cucujiformia
- Family: Cerambycidae
- Genus: Cotyclytus
- Species: C. distinctus

Binomial name
- Cotyclytus distinctus (Zajciw, 1963)

Species of beetle

Cotyclytus distinctus is a species of beetle in the family Cerambycidae. It was described by Zajciw in 1963.
