= Pirangoclytus mendosus =

Scientific classification
- Kingdom: Animalia
- Phylum: Arthropoda
- Class: Insecta
- Order: Coleoptera
- Suborder: Polyphaga
- Infraorder: Cucujiformia
- Family: Cerambycidae
- Genus: Pirangoclytus
- Species: P. mendosus

Binomial name
- Pirangoclytus mendosus (Galileo & Martins, 1996)

Species of beetle

Pirangoclytus mendosus is a species of beetle in the family Cerambycidae. It was described by Galileo and Martins in 1996.
