= Anthoboscus tricolor =

Scientific classification
- Kingdom: Animalia
- Phylum: Arthropoda
- Class: Insecta
- Order: Coleoptera
- Suborder: Polyphaga
- Infraorder: Cucujiformia
- Family: Cerambycidae
- Genus: Anthoboscus
- Species: A. tricolor

Binomial name
- Anthoboscus tricolor (Chevrolat, 1835)

Species of beetle

Anthoboscus tricolor is a species of beetle in the family Cerambycidae. It was described by Chevrolat in 1835.
