= Ayriclytus simoni =

Scientific classification
- Kingdom: Animalia
- Phylum: Arthropoda
- Class: Insecta
- Order: Coleoptera
- Suborder: Polyphaga
- Infraorder: Cucujiformia
- Family: Cerambycidae
- Genus: Ayriclytus
- Species: A. simoni

Binomial name
- Ayriclytus simoni (Lameere, 1893)

Species of beetle

Ayriclytus simoni is a species of beetle in the family Cerambycidae. It was described by Auguste Lameere in 1893.
