= Cotyclytus basalis =

Scientific classification
- Domain: Eukaryota
- Kingdom: Animalia
- Phylum: Arthropoda
- Class: Insecta
- Order: Coleoptera
- Suborder: Polyphaga
- Infraorder: Cucujiformia
- Family: Cerambycidae
- Genus: Cotyclytus
- Species: C. basalis

Binomial name
- Cotyclytus basalis (Chevrolat, 1862)

Species of beetle

Cotyclytus basalis is a species of beetle in the family Cerambycidae. It was described by Chevrolat in 1862.
