= Cotyclytus dorsalis =

Scientific classification
- Domain: Eukaryota
- Kingdom: Animalia
- Phylum: Arthropoda
- Class: Insecta
- Order: Coleoptera
- Suborder: Polyphaga
- Infraorder: Cucujiformia
- Family: Cerambycidae
- Genus: Cotyclytus
- Species: C. dorsalis

Binomial name
- Cotyclytus dorsalis (Laporte & Gory, 1835)

Species of beetle

Cotyclytus dorsalis is a species of beetle in the family Cerambycidae. It was described by Laporte and Gory in 1835.
