= Ygapema mulleri =

Scientific classification
- Kingdom: Animalia
- Phylum: Arthropoda
- Class: Insecta
- Order: Coleoptera
- Suborder: Polyphaga
- Infraorder: Cucujiformia
- Family: Cerambycidae
- Genus: Ygapema
- Species: Y. mulleri

Binomial name
- Ygapema mulleri (E. Fuchs, 1955)

Species of beetle

Ygapema mulleri is a species of beetle in the family Cerambycidae. It was described by Ernst Fuchs in 1955.
