= Cotyclytus sobrinus =

Scientific classification
- Domain: Eukaryota
- Kingdom: Animalia
- Phylum: Arthropoda
- Class: Insecta
- Order: Coleoptera
- Suborder: Polyphaga
- Infraorder: Cucujiformia
- Family: Cerambycidae
- Genus: Cotyclytus
- Species: C. sobrinus

Binomial name
- Cotyclytus sobrinus (Laporte & Gory, 1835)

Species of beetle

Cotyclytus sobrinus is a species of beetle in the family Cerambycidae. It was described by Laporte and Gory in 1835.
