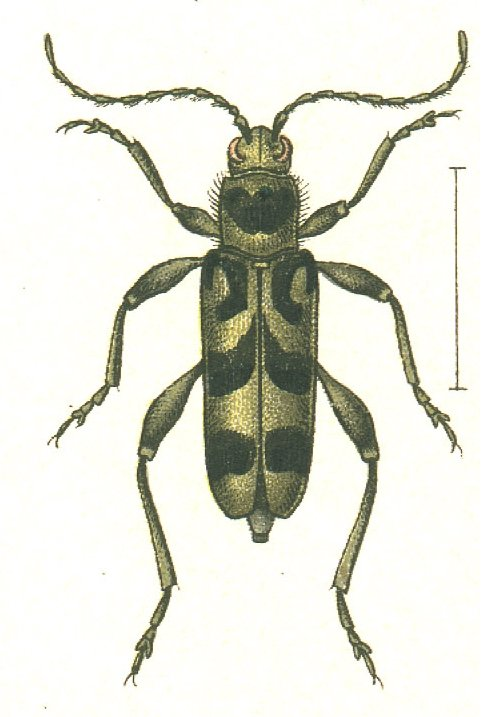
- Anthoboscus herbsti = Chlorophorus herbstii

Scientific classification
- Kingdom: Animalia
- Phylum: Arthropoda
- Class: Insecta
- Order: Coleoptera
- Suborder: Polyphaga
- Infraorder: Cucujiformia
- Family: Cerambycidae
- Tribe: Clytini
- Genus: Anthoboscus

= Anthoboscus =

Genus of beetles

Anthoboscus is a genus of beetles in the family Cerambycidae, containing the following species:

- Anthoboscus oculatus Giesbert, 1992
- Anthoboscus tricolor (Chevrolat, 1835)
