= Cotyclytus potiuna =

Scientific classification
- Domain: Eukaryota
- Kingdom: Animalia
- Phylum: Arthropoda
- Class: Insecta
- Order: Coleoptera
- Suborder: Polyphaga
- Infraorder: Cucujiformia
- Family: Cerambycidae
- Genus: Cotyclytus
- Species: C. potiuna

Binomial name
- Cotyclytus potiuna (Galileo & Martins, 2007)

Species of beetle

Cotyclytus potiuna is a species of beetle in the family Cerambycidae. It was described by Galileo and Martins in 2007.
