= Pirangoclytus rhinotragoides =

Scientific classification
- Kingdom: Animalia
- Phylum: Arthropoda
- Class: Insecta
- Order: Coleoptera
- Suborder: Polyphaga
- Infraorder: Cucujiformia
- Family: Cerambycidae
- Genus: Pirangoclytus
- Species: P. rhinotragoides

Binomial name
- Pirangoclytus rhinotragoides (Thomson, 1860)

Species of beetle

Pirangoclytus rhinotragoides is a species of beetle in the family Cerambycidae. It was described by Thomson in 1860.
