= Unaiuba vitticollis =

Scientific classification
- Kingdom: Animalia
- Phylum: Arthropoda
- Class: Insecta
- Order: Coleoptera
- Suborder: Polyphaga
- Infraorder: Cucujiformia
- Family: Cerambycidae
- Genus: Unaiuba
- Species: U. vitticollis

Binomial name
- Unaiuba vitticollis (Aurivillius, 1920)

Species of beetle

Unaiuba vitticollis is a species of beetle in the family Cerambycidae. It was described by Per Olof Christopher Aurivillius in 1920. It is native to Peru.
