= Ygapema clavata =

Scientific classification
- Kingdom: Animalia
- Phylum: Arthropoda
- Class: Insecta
- Order: Coleoptera
- Suborder: Polyphaga
- Infraorder: Cucujiformia
- Family: Cerambycidae
- Genus: Ygapema
- Species: Y. clavata

Binomial name
- Ygapema clavata (Chevrolat, 1862)

Species of beetle

Ygapema clavata is a species of beetle in the family Cerambycidae. It was described by Chevrolat in 1862.
