= Cotyclytus scenicus =

Scientific classification
- Domain: Eukaryota
- Kingdom: Animalia
- Phylum: Arthropoda
- Class: Insecta
- Order: Coleoptera
- Suborder: Polyphaga
- Infraorder: Cucujiformia
- Family: Cerambycidae
- Genus: Cotyclytus
- Species: C. scenicus

Binomial name
- Cotyclytus scenicus (Pascoe, 1866)

Species of beetle

Cotyclytus scenicus is a species of beetle in the family Cerambycidae. It was described by Pascoe in 1866.
