= Rostroclytus =

Scientific classification
- Kingdom: Animalia
- Phylum: Arthropoda
- Class: Insecta
- Order: Coleoptera
- Suborder: Polyphaga
- Infraorder: Cucujiformia
- Family: Cerambycidae
- Tribe: Clytini
- Genus: Rostroclytus

Genus of beetles

Rostroclytus is a genus of beetles in the family Cerambycidae, containing the following species:

- Rostroclytus capixaba (Napp & Monne, 2006)
- Rostroclytus rondonianus (Napp & Monne, 2006)
- Rostroclytus turuna (Galileo & Martins, 2007)
