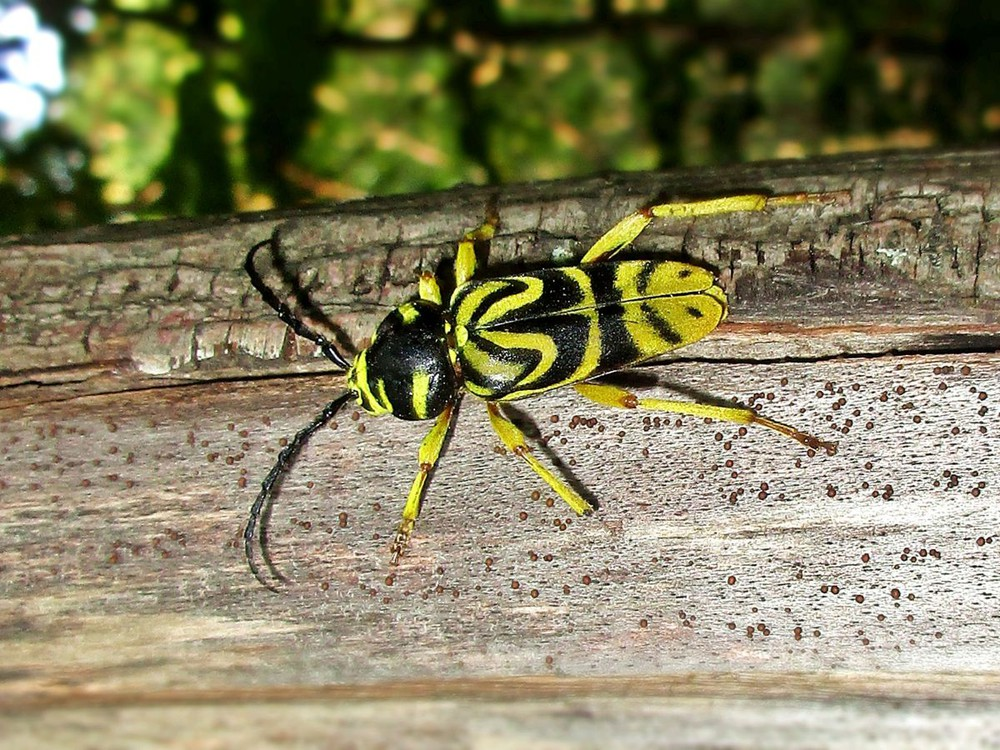

Conservation status
- Unrankable (NatureServe)

Scientific classification
- Kingdom: Animalia
- Phylum: Arthropoda
- Class: Insecta
- Order: Coleoptera
- Suborder: Polyphaga
- Infraorder: Cucujiformia
- Family: Cerambycidae
- Subfamily: Cerambycinae
- Tribe: Clytini
- Genus: Glycobius; LeConte, 1873
- Species: G. speciosus

Binomial name
- Glycobius speciosus (Say, 1828)

= Glycobius =

Genus of beetles

Glycobius speciosus is a species of beetle in the family Cerambycidae, the only species in the genus Glycobius, known commonly as the sugar maple borer, as the larvae feed on sugar maple (Acer saccharum).
