= Pirangoclytus sulphurosus =

Scientific classification
- Kingdom: Animalia
- Phylum: Arthropoda
- Class: Insecta
- Order: Coleoptera
- Suborder: Polyphaga
- Infraorder: Cucujiformia
- Family: Cerambycidae
- Genus: Pirangoclytus
- Species: P. sulphurosus

Binomial name
- Pirangoclytus sulphurosus (Di Iorio, 2006)

Species of beetle

Pirangoclytus sulphurosus is a species of beetle in the family Cerambycidae. It was described by Di Iorio in 2006.
