= Ygapema plaumanni =

Scientific classification
- Kingdom: Animalia
- Phylum: Arthropoda
- Class: Insecta
- Order: Coleoptera
- Suborder: Polyphaga
- Infraorder: Cucujiformia
- Family: Cerambycidae
- Genus: Ygapema
- Species: Y. plaumanni

Binomial name
- Ygapema plaumanni (E. Fuchs, 1966)

Species of beetle

Ygapema plaumanni is a species of beetle in the family Cerambycidae. It was described by Ernst Fuchs in 1966.
