= Anthoboscus oculatus =

Scientific classification
- Kingdom: Animalia
- Phylum: Arthropoda
- Class: Insecta
- Order: Coleoptera
- Suborder: Polyphaga
- Infraorder: Cucujiformia
- Family: Cerambycidae
- Genus: Anthoboscus
- Species: A. oculatus

Binomial name
- Anthoboscus oculatus Giesbert, 1992

Species of beetle

Anthoboscus oculatus is a species of beetle in the family Cerambycidae. It was described by Giesbert in 1992.
