= Unaiuba pinima =

Scientific classification
- Kingdom: Animalia
- Phylum: Arthropoda
- Class: Insecta
- Order: Coleoptera
- Suborder: Polyphaga
- Infraorder: Cucujiformia
- Family: Cerambycidae
- Genus: Unaiuba
- Species: U. pinima

Binomial name
- Unaiuba pinima (Galileo & Martins, 2007)

Species of beetle

Unaiuba pinima is a species of beetle in the family Cerambycidae. It was described by Galileo and Martins in 2007.
