= Calloides lorquini =

Scientific classification
- Kingdom: Animalia
- Phylum: Arthropoda
- Class: Insecta
- Order: Coleoptera
- Suborder: Polyphaga
- Infraorder: Cucujiformia
- Family: Cerambycidae
- Genus: Calloides
- Species: C. lorquini

Binomial name
- Calloides lorquini (Buquet, 1859)

Species of beetle

Calloides lorquini is a species of beetle in the family Cerambycidae. It was described by Buquet in 1859.
