= Itaclytus justini =

Scientific classification
- Kingdom: Animalia
- Phylum: Arthropoda
- Class: Insecta
- Order: Coleoptera
- Suborder: Polyphaga
- Infraorder: Cucujiformia
- Family: Cerambycidae
- Genus: Itaclytus
- Species: I. justini

Binomial name
- Itaclytus justini (Chevrolat, 1862)

Species of beetle

Itaclytus justini is a species of beetle in the family Cerambycidae. It was described by Chevrolat in 1862.
