= Dexithea klugii =

Scientific classification
- Kingdom: Animalia
- Phylum: Arthropoda
- Class: Insecta
- Order: Coleoptera
- Suborder: Polyphaga
- Infraorder: Cucujiformia
- Family: Cerambycidae
- Genus: Dexithea
- Species: D. klugii

Binomial name
- Dexithea klugii (Laporte & Gory, 1835)

Species of beetle

Dexithea klugii is a species of beetle in the family Cerambycidae. It was described by Laporte and Gory in 1835.
