= Pirangoclytus latecinctus =

Scientific classification
- Kingdom: Animalia
- Phylum: Arthropoda
- Class: Insecta
- Order: Coleoptera
- Suborder: Polyphaga
- Infraorder: Cucujiformia
- Family: Cerambycidae
- Genus: Pirangoclytus
- Species: P. latecinctus

Binomial name
- Pirangoclytus latecinctus (Bates, 1870)

Species of beetle

Pirangoclytus latecinctus is a species of beetle in the family Cerambycidae. It was described by Henry Walter Bates in 1870.
