= Triodoclytus =

Triodoclytus lanifer

Scientific classification
- Kingdom: Animalia
- Phylum: Arthropoda
- Clade: Pancrustacea
- Class: Insecta
- Order: Coleoptera
- Suborder: Polyphaga
- Infraorder: Cucujiformia
- Family: Cerambycidae
- Genus: Triodoclytus
- Species: T. lanifer

Binomial name
- Triodoclytus lanifer (LeConte, 1873)

Genus of beetles

Triodoclytus lanifer is a species of beetle in the family Cerambycidae, the only one in the genus Triodoclytus.
