= Cetimaju =

Cetimaju abare

Scientific classification
- Kingdom: Animalia
- Phylum: Arthropoda
- Class: Insecta
- Order: Coleoptera
- Suborder: Polyphaga
- Infraorder: Cucujiformia
- Family: Cerambycidae
- Genus: Cetimaju
- Species: C. abare

Binomial name
- Cetimaju abare Galileo & Martins, 2007

Genus of beetles

Cetimaju abare is a species of beetle in the family Cerambycidae, the only species in the genus Cetimaju.
