= Plesioclytus =

Plesioclytus relictus

Scientific classification
- Kingdom: Animalia
- Phylum: Arthropoda
- Class: Insecta
- Order: Coleoptera
- Suborder: Polyphaga
- Infraorder: Cucujiformia
- Family: Cerambycidae
- Genus: Plesioclytus
- Species: P. relictus

Binomial name
- Plesioclytus relictus Giesbert, 1993

Genus of beetles

Plesioclytus relictus is a species of beetle in the family Cerambycidae, the only species in the genus Plesioclytus.
