= Clytoleptus =

Clytoleptus albofasciatus

Scientific classification
- Kingdom: Animalia
- Phylum: Arthropoda
- Class: Insecta
- Order: Coleoptera
- Suborder: Polyphaga
- Infraorder: Cucujiformia
- Family: Cerambycidae
- Genus: Clytoleptus
- Species: C. albofasciatus

Binomial name
- Clytoleptus albofasciatus (Laporte & Gory, 1835)

Genus of beetles

Clytoleptus albofasciatus is a species of beetle in the family Cerambycidae, the only species in the genus Clytoleptus.
