= Sarosesthes =

Sarosesthes fulminans

Scientific classification
- Kingdom: Animalia
- Phylum: Arthropoda
- Class: Insecta
- Order: Coleoptera
- Suborder: Polyphaga
- Infraorder: Cucujiformia
- Family: Cerambycidae
- Genus: Sarosesthes
- Species: S. fulminans

Binomial name
- Sarosesthes fulminans (Fabricius, 1775)

Genus of beetles

Sarosesthes fulminans is a species of beetle in the family Cerambycidae, the only species in the genus Sarosesthes.
