= Tylcus =

Scientific classification
- Domain: Eukaryota
- Kingdom: Animalia
- Phylum: Arthropoda
- Class: Insecta
- Order: Coleoptera
- Suborder: Polyphaga
- Infraorder: Cucujiformia
- Family: Cerambycidae
- Genus: Tylcus
- Species: T. hartwegii

Binomial name
- Tylcus hartwegii (White, 1855)

Genus of beetles

Tylcus hartwegii is a species of beetle in the family Cerambycidae, the only species in the genus Tylcus.
