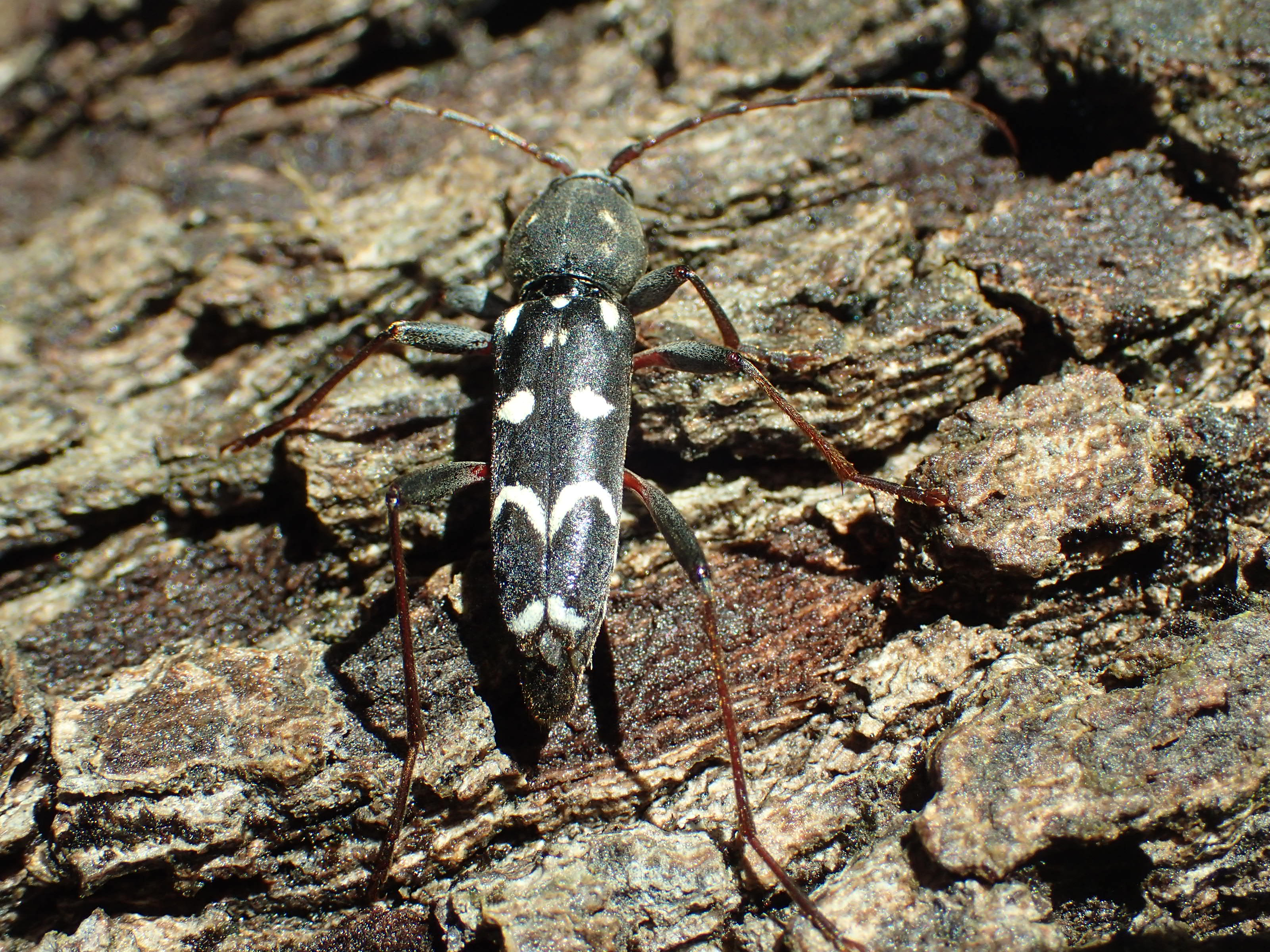
- Isotomus speciosus

Scientific classification
- Kingdom: Animalia
- Phylum: Arthropoda
- Class: Insecta
- Order: Coleoptera
- Suborder: Polyphaga
- Infraorder: Cucujiformia
- Family: Cerambycidae
- Genus: Isotomus
- Species: I. comptus

Binomial name
- Isotomus comptus (Mannerheim in Hummel, 1825)

= Isotomus =

Isotomus comptus

Genus of beetles

Isotomus comptus is a species of beetle in the family Cerambycidae, the only species in the genus Isotomus.
