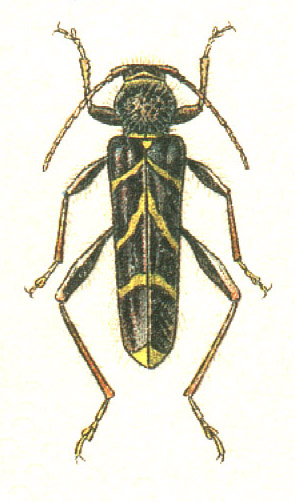
- Cyrtoclytus capra by G.G. Yakobson

Scientific classification
- Kingdom: Animalia
- Phylum: Arthropoda
- Class: Insecta
- Order: Coleoptera
- Suborder: Polyphaga
- Infraorder: Cucujiformia
- Family: Cerambycidae
- Genus: Cyrtoclytus; Ganglbauer, 1882

= Cyrtoclytus =

Genus of beetles

Cyrtoclytus is a genus of beetles belonging to the family Cerambycidae.

The species of this genus are found in Eurasia and Northern America.

Species:

- Cyrtoclytus agathus Holzschuh, 1999
