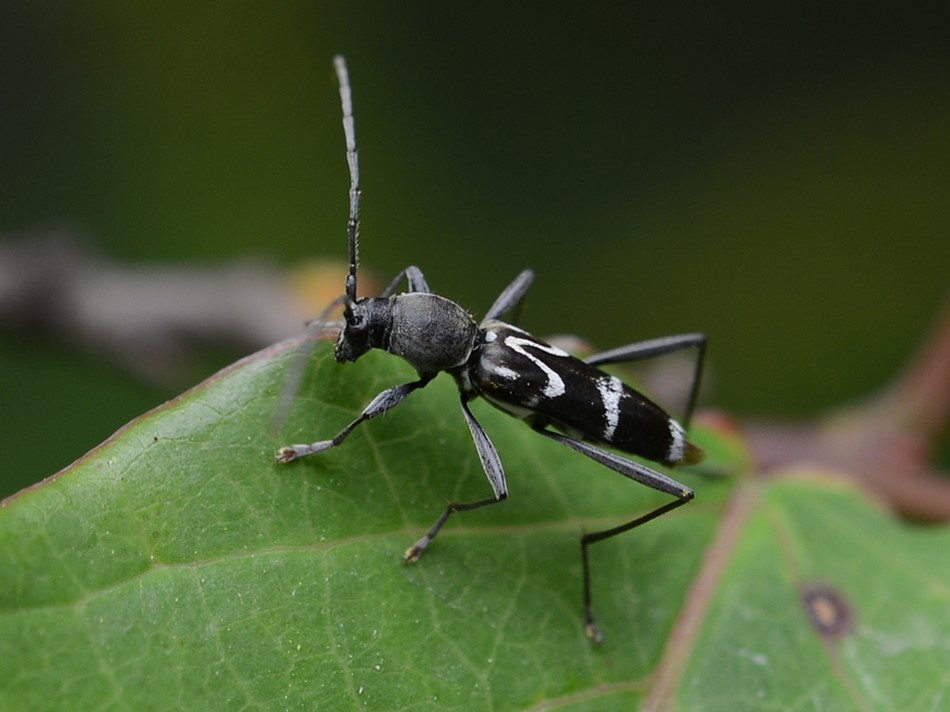
- Rhaphuma gracilipes, South Korea

Scientific classification
- Domain: Eukaryota
- Kingdom: Animalia
- Phylum: Arthropoda
- Class: Insecta
- Order: Coleoptera
- Suborder: Polyphaga
- Infraorder: Cucujiformia
- Family: Cerambycidae
- Subfamily: Cerambycinae
- Tribe: Clytini
- Genus: Rhaphuma; Pascoe, 1858

Diversity
- more than 220 species

= Rhaphuma =

Genus of beetles

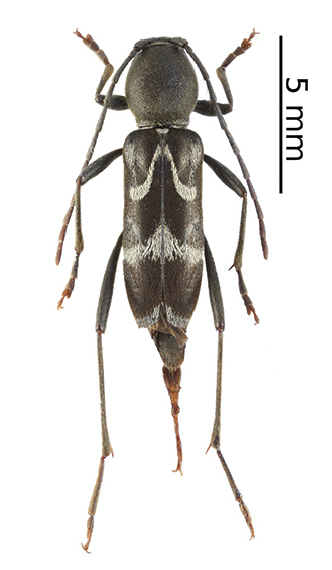
Rhaphuma gracilipes (female)

Rhaphuma is a genus of typical longhorn beetles in the family Cerambycidae. There are more than 200 described species in the genus Rhaphuma.

== Species ==
These 220 species belong to Rhaphuma.

- Rhaphuma acrocarpi Gardner, 1940
- Rhaphuma aequalis Holzschuh, 1991
- Rhaphuma afflata Holzschuh, 1983
- Rhaphuma albicolon Holzschuh, 2006
- Rhaphuma albonotata Pic, 1915
- Rhaphuma albosignata Pic, 1943
- Rhaphuma amamiensis Hayashi, 1983
- Rhaphuma angustata (Pic, 1920)
- Rhaphuma anongi Gressitt & Rondon, 1970
- Rhaphuma anopla Holzschuh, 1983
- Rhaphuma aperta Gressitt, 1951
- Rhaphuma aranea Holzschuh, 1984
- Rhaphuma argentogrisea Dauber, 2003
- Rhaphuma atrata Fisher, 1935
- Rhaphuma atrosignata Pic, 1925
- Rhaphuma baibarae Matsushita, 1931
- Rhaphuma barbouri Gressitt, 1959
- Rhaphuma barriesi Dauber, 2002
- Rhaphuma bhaktai Holzschuh, 1983
- Rhaphuma bicolor Pic, 1927
- Rhaphuma bicolorifemoralis Gressitt & Rondon, 1970
- Rhaphuma bimaculata Schwarzer, 1931
- Rhaphuma binhensis (Pic, 1922)
- Rhaphuma binotata Hua, 1989
- Rhaphuma bivittata Aurivillius, 1916
- Rhaphuma brevivittata (Aurivillius, 1922)
- Rhaphuma brigittae Holzschuh, 1991
- Rhaphuma brodskyi Holzschuh, 1992
- Rhaphuma bucseki Viktora, 2014
- Rhaphuma campanulifera Aurivillius, 1922
- Rhaphuma chatterjeei Gardner, 1940
- Rhaphuma chewi Dauber, 2003
- Rhaphuma circumscripta (Schwarzer, 1925)
- Rhaphuma clarina Gressitt & Rondon, 1970
- Rhaphuma clermonti Pic, 1927
- Rhaphuma comosella Holzschuh, 2006
- Rhaphuma conformis (Gahan, 1906)
- Rhaphuma connexa Aurivillius, 1922
- Rhaphuma consona Holzschuh, 1991
- Rhaphuma constricta Gressitt & Rondon, 1970
- Rhaphuma contiguaria Holzschuh, 2009
- Rhaphuma decora Holzschuh, 1995
- Rhaphuma delicata Kano, 1933
- Rhaphuma desaii Gardner, 1940
- Rhaphuma diana Gahan, 1906
- Rhaphuma diminuta (Bates, 1873)
- Rhaphuma disconotata (Pic, 1908)
- Rhaphuma diversevittata Pic, 1943
- Rhaphuma diversipennis Pic, 1920
- Rhaphuma duplex Holzschuh, 1991
- Rhaphuma elegantula Gahan, 1906
- Rhaphuma eleodina Gressitt & Rondon, 1970
- Rhaphuma elongata Gressitt, 1940
- Rhaphuma encausta Holzschuh, 1991
- Rhaphuma excisa Holzschuh, 1992
- Rhaphuma falx Holzschuh, 1991
- Rhaphuma farinosula Holzschuh, 2003
- Rhaphuma floresica Viktora, 2014
- Rhaphuma frustrata Holzschuh, 1993
- Rhaphuma fucosa Holzschuh, 2007
- Rhaphuma fulgurata Gahan, 1906
- Rhaphuma gilvitarsis Holzschuh, 1992
- Rhaphuma gracilipes (Faldermann, 1835)
- Rhaphuma grisescens Pic, 1929
- Rhaphuma herminae Holzschuh, 1984
- Rhaphuma histrio (Chevrolat, 1863)
- Rhaphuma horsfieldii (White, 1855)
- Rhaphuma illicata Holzschuh, 1991
- Rhaphuma ilsae Holzschuh, 1983
- Rhaphuma impressiceps Pic, 1943
- Rhaphuma improba Holzschuh, 1992
- Rhaphuma improvisa Holzschuh, 1991
- Rhaphuma incarinata Pic, 1925
- Rhaphuma indifferens Holzschuh, 1992
- Rhaphuma innotata Pic, 1927
- Rhaphuma insignaticollis Pic, 1937
- Rhaphuma interrupta Pic, 1925
- Rhaphuma inusta Holzschuh, 1991
- Rhaphuma joshii Holzschuh, 1984
- Rhaphuma klapperichi Tippmann, 1955
- Rhaphuma krali Holzschuh, 1992
- Rhaphuma lanzhui Holzschuh, 1991
- Rhaphuma laosica Gressitt & Rondon, 1970
- Rhaphuma lubricula Holzschuh, 2003
- Rhaphuma lutarella Holzschuh, 2003
- Rhaphuma luteopubens Pic, 1937
- Rhaphuma maceki Holzschuh, 1992
- Rhaphuma maculata Schwarzer, 1931
- Rhaphuma maculicollis Gressitt & Rondon, 1970
- Rhaphuma manipurensis Gahan, 1906
- Rhaphuma marialaurae Gouverneur, 2015
- Rhaphuma mekonga Gressitt & Rondon, 1970
- Rhaphuma minima Gressitt & Rondon, 1970
- Rhaphuma minuta Pic, 1943
- Rhaphuma moerens Holzschuh, 1983
- Rhaphuma mucosa Holzschuh, 2003
- Rhaphuma mushana Matsushita, 1936
- Rhaphuma nigripes Jordan, 1894
- Rhaphuma nigrocincta Matsushita, 1931
- Rhaphuma nigrolineata Pic, 1915
- Rhaphuma nishidai Hayashi & Makihara, 1981
- Rhaphuma ogatai Mitono, 1942
- Rhaphuma pacholatkoi Viktora, 2014
- Rhaphuma patkaina Gahan, 1906
- Rhaphuma paucis Holzschuh, 1992
- Rhaphuma phiale Gahan, 1906
- Rhaphuma pictiventris Gressitt, 1939
- Rhaphuma pieli Gressitt, 1940
- Rhaphuma pingana Pic, 1926
- Rhaphuma placida Pascoe, 1858
- Rhaphuma praeusta Lameere, 1890
- Rhaphuma pseudobinhensis Gressitt & Rondon, 1970
- Rhaphuma pseudominuta Gressitt & Rondon, 1970
- Rhaphuma puncticollis Holzschuh, 1992
- Rhaphuma quadricolor (Castelnau & Gory, 1841)
- Rhaphuma quadrimaculata Pic, 1923
- Rhaphuma querciphaga Holzschuh, 1984
- Rhaphuma quercus Gardner, 1940
- Rhaphuma quinquenotata Chevrolat, 1863
- Rhaphuma quintini Gressitt & Rondon, 1970
- Rhaphuma rassei Dauber, 2002
- Rhaphuma reticulata (Jordan, 1894)
- Rhaphuma retrofasciata Dauber, 2004
- Rhaphuma rhea Gahan, 1906
- Rhaphuma rubromaculata Dauber, 2006
- Rhaphuma ruficollis Mitono, 1942
- Rhaphuma rufobasalis Pic, 1924
- Rhaphuma rybniceki Holzschuh, 1992
- Rhaphuma sabahensis Dauber, 2006
- Rhaphuma salemensis Gardner, 1940
- Rhaphuma semiclathrata (Chevrolat, 1863)
- Rhaphuma sexnotata Chevrolat, 1863
- Rhaphuma sharmai Holzschuh, 1990
- Rhaphuma shelfordi Dauber, 2008
- Rhaphuma signata (Gahan, 1907)
- Rhaphuma steinkae Holzschuh, 1991
- Rhaphuma strnadi Holzschuh, 1992
- Rhaphuma subvarimaculata Gressitt & Rondon, 1970
- Rhaphuma sulphurea Gressitt, 1941
- Rhaphuma superba Dauber, 2002
- Rhaphuma suthra Gardner, 1940
- Rhaphuma suturalis Gahan, 1906
- Rhaphuma tenerrima Holzschuh, 1991
- Rhaphuma tenuigrisea Dauber, 2003
- Rhaphuma teres Holzschuh, 1989
- Rhaphuma tertia Holzschuh, 1991
- Rhaphuma testaceiceps Pic, 1915
- Rhaphuma testaceicolor Pic, 1920
- Rhaphuma theryi (Pic, 1900)
- Rhaphuma timorica Viktora, 2014
- Rhaphuma torrida Holzschuh, 1991
- Rhaphuma tricolor Gressitt & Rondon, 1970
- Rhaphuma trimaculata Chevrolat, 1863
- Rhaphuma trinalba Gahan, 1906
- Rhaphuma trinotata Pic, 1923
- Rhaphuma unigena Holzschuh, 1993
- Rhaphuma ustulatula Holzschuh, 2006
- Rhaphuma vagesignata Pic, 1937
- Rhaphuma virens Matsushita, 1931
- Rhaphuma vittata (Gahan, 1907)
- Rhaphuma weigeli Holzschuh, 2003
- Rhaphuma wiedemanni (Castelnau & Gory, 1841)
- Rhaphuma xenisca (Bates, 1884)
