= Tanyochraethes =

Scientific classification
- Kingdom: Animalia
- Phylum: Arthropoda
- Class: Insecta
- Order: Coleoptera
- Suborder: Polyphaga
- Infraorder: Cucujiformia
- Family: Cerambycidae
- Tribe: Clytini
- Genus: Tanyochraethes

Genus of beetles

Tanyochraethes is a genus of beetles in the family Cerambycidae, containing the following species:

- Tanyochraethes anthophilus (Chevrolat, 1860)
- Tanyochraethes cinereolus (Bates, 1892)
- Tanyochraethes clathratus (Chevrolat, 1860)
- Tanyochraethes hololeucus (Bates, 1892)
- Tanyochraethes minca Galileo & Martins, 2007
- Tanyochraethes ochrozona (Bates, 1885)
- Tanyochraethes smithi Chemsak & Linsley, 1965
- Tanyochraethes tildeni Chemsak & Linsley, 1965
- Tanyochraethes truquii (Chevrolat, 1860)
