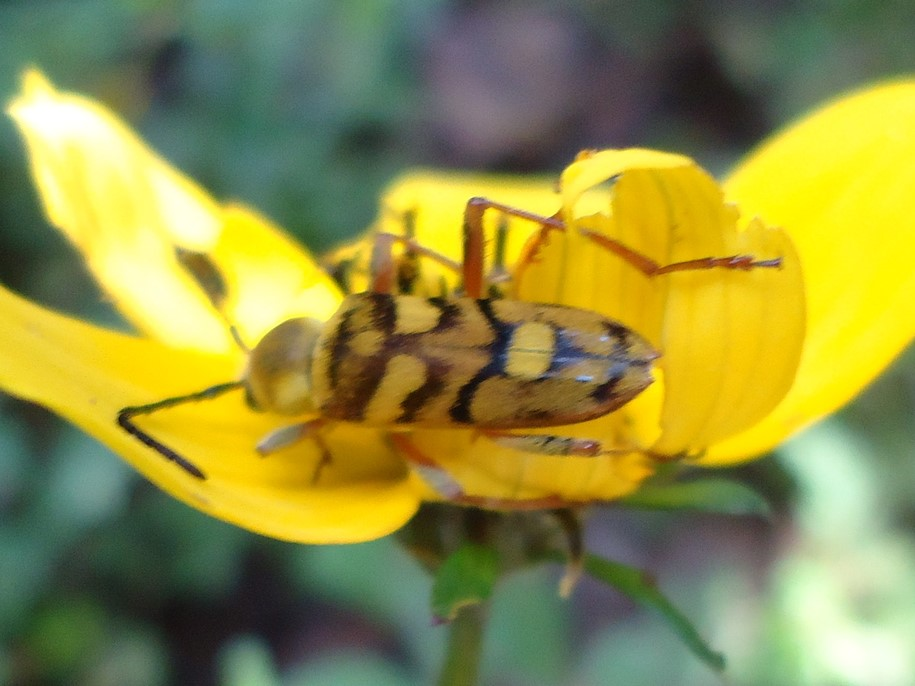

Scientific classification
- Kingdom: Animalia
- Phylum: Arthropoda
- Class: Insecta
- Order: Coleoptera
- Suborder: Polyphaga
- Infraorder: Cucujiformia
- Family: Cerambycidae
- Genus: Ochraethes
- Species: O. viridiventris

Binomial name
- Ochraethes viridiventris (Chevrolat, 1860)

Synonyms
- Clytus (Ochroesthes) viridiventris Chevrolat, 1860; Ochraethes clerinus Bates, 1892; Ochraethes nigritus Bates, 1892

= Ochraethes viridiventris =

Species of beetle

Ochraethes viridiventris is a species of beetle in the family Cerambycidae. It was described by Louis Alexandre Auguste Chevrolat in 1860.
