= Ochraethes obscuricornis =

Scientific classification
- Domain: Eukaryota
- Kingdom: Animalia
- Phylum: Arthropoda
- Class: Insecta
- Order: Coleoptera
- Suborder: Polyphaga
- Infraorder: Cucujiformia
- Family: Cerambycidae
- Genus: Ochraethes
- Species: O. obscuricornis

Binomial name
- Ochraethes obscuricornis Bates, 1892

Species of beetle

Ochraethes obscuricornis is a species of beetle in the family Cerambycidae. It was described by Bates in 1892.
