= Tanyochraethes truquii =

Scientific classification
- Kingdom: Animalia
- Phylum: Arthropoda
- Class: Insecta
- Order: Coleoptera
- Suborder: Polyphaga
- Infraorder: Cucujiformia
- Family: Cerambycidae
- Genus: Tanyochraethes
- Species: T. truquii

Binomial name
- Tanyochraethes truquii (Chevrolat, 1860)

Species of beetle

Tanyochraethes truquii is a species of beetle in the family Cerambycidae. It was described by Chevrolat in 1860.
