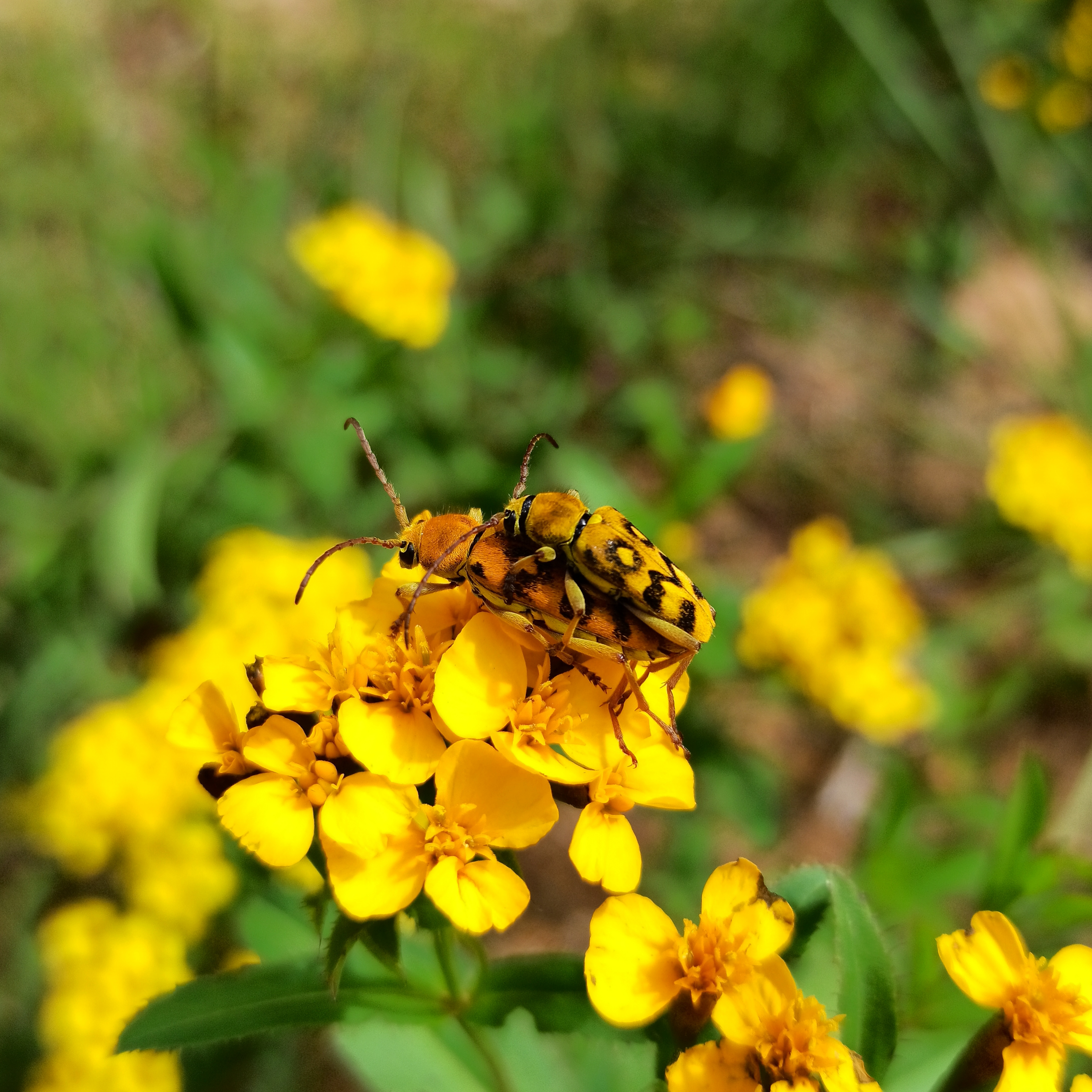

Scientific classification
- Kingdom: Animalia
- Phylum: Arthropoda
- Class: Insecta
- Order: Coleoptera
- Suborder: Polyphaga
- Infraorder: Cucujiformia
- Family: Cerambycidae
- Genus: Ochraethes
- Species: O. sommeri

Binomial name
- Ochraethes sommeri (Chevrolat, 1835)

Synonyms
- Clytus sommeri Chevrolat, 1835; Clytus tibialis Laporte & Gory, 1836; Clytus (Ochroesthes) circuliferus Chevrolat, 1860; Trichoxys giesberti Botero et al. 2019

= Ochraethes sommeri =

Species of beetle

Ochraethes sommeri is a species of beetle in the family Cerambycidae. It was described by Louis Alexandre Auguste Chevrolat in 1835.
