= Tanyochraethes ochrozona =

Scientific classification
- Kingdom: Animalia
- Phylum: Arthropoda
- Class: Insecta
- Order: Coleoptera
- Suborder: Polyphaga
- Infraorder: Cucujiformia
- Family: Cerambycidae
- Genus: Tanyochraethes
- Species: T. ochrozona

Binomial name
- Tanyochraethes ochrozona (Bates, 1885)

Species of beetle

Tanyochraethes ochrozona is a species of beetle in the family Cerambycidae. It was described by Henry Walter Bates in 1885.
