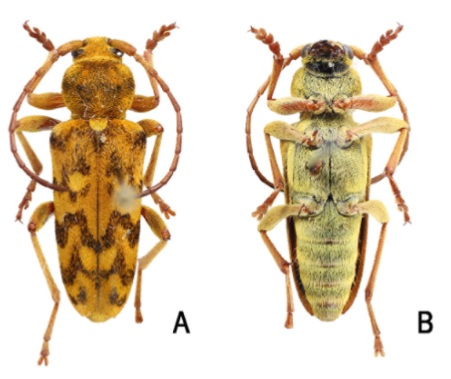

Scientific classification
- Kingdom: Animalia
- Phylum: Arthropoda
- Class: Insecta
- Order: Coleoptera
- Suborder: Polyphaga
- Infraorder: Cucujiformia
- Family: Cerambycidae
- Genus: Ochraethes
- Species: O. confusus

Binomial name
- Ochraethes confusus Perez-Flores & Toledo-Hernandez, 2022

= Ochraethes confusus =

Species of beetle

Ochraethes confusus is a species of beetle of the family Cerambycidae. It is found in Mexico (Puebla, Oaxaca, Chiapas, Tabasco).

== Description ==
Adults reach a length of about 15.15 mm. The head, thorax, elytra, abdominal ventrites I–III and basal half of IV are integument black, while the antennae, palpi, legs, posterior half of abdominal ventrite IV and abdominal ventrite V range from reddish brown to dark orange.

== Etymology ==
The species name is derived from Latin confusus (meaning confused) and refers to the irregular pattern of black pubescence on the elytra, which is similar to that of other species of the genus.
