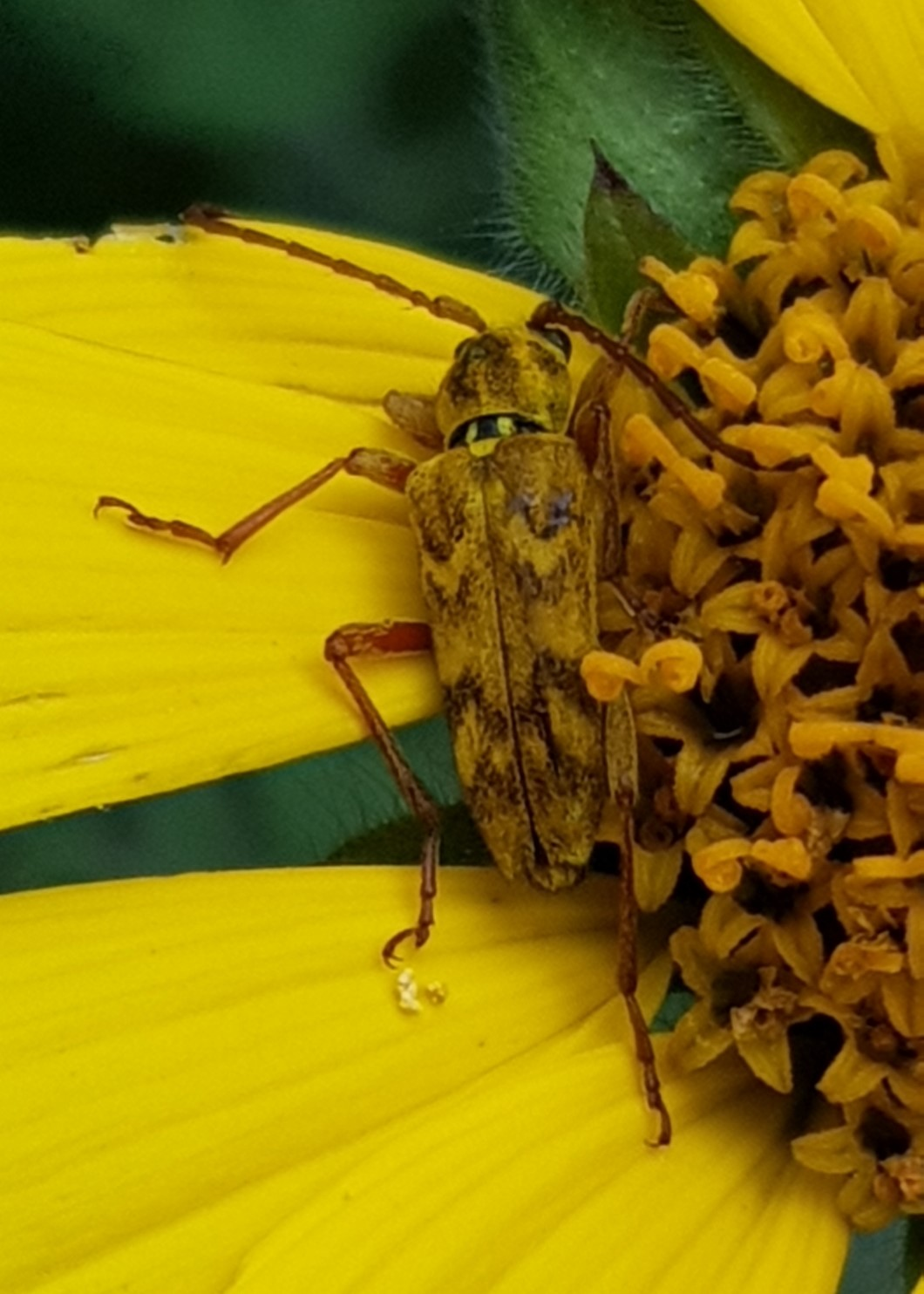

Scientific classification
- Kingdom: Animalia
- Phylum: Arthropoda
- Class: Insecta
- Order: Coleoptera
- Suborder: Polyphaga
- Infraorder: Cucujiformia
- Family: Cerambycidae
- Genus: Ochraethes
- Species: O. z-littera

Binomial name
- Ochraethes z-littera (Chevrolat, 1860)

Synonyms
- Clytus (Ochroesthes) z-littera Chevrolat, 1860; Clytus (Ochroesthes) cristoforii Chevrolat, 1860; Ochraethes cristoforii Ochraethes litura; Bates, 1885

= Ochraethes z-littera =

Species of beetle

Ochraethes z-littera is a species of beetle in the family Cerambycidae. It was described by Louis Alexandre Auguste Chevrolat in 1860.
