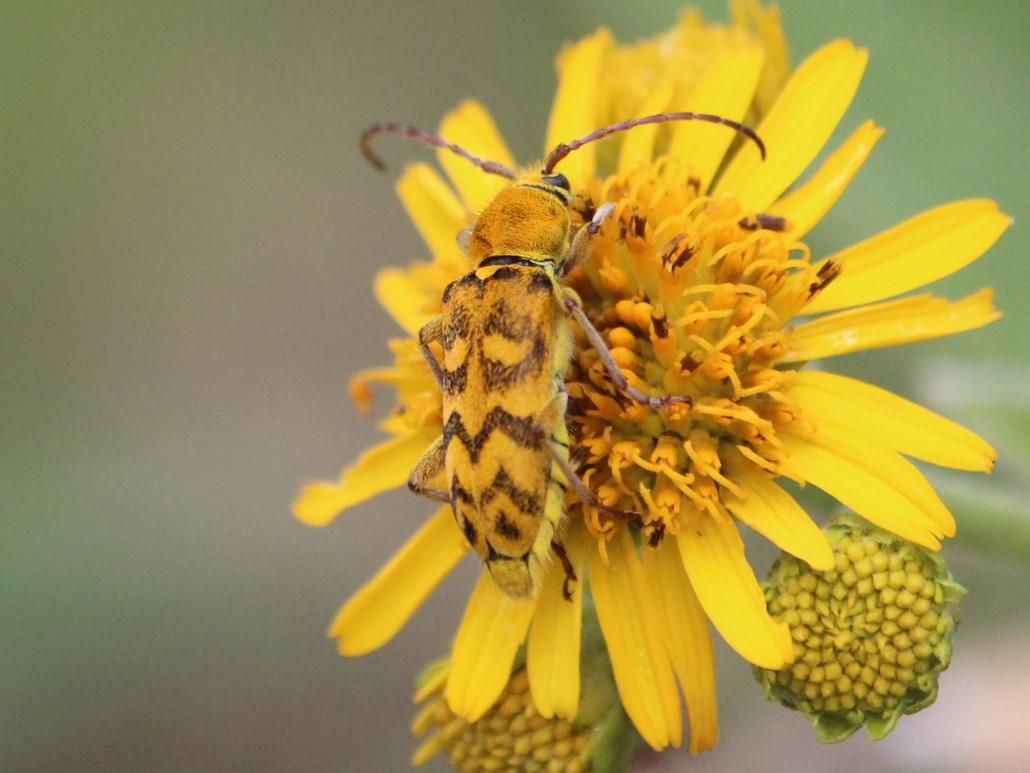

Scientific classification
- Domain: Eukaryota
- Kingdom: Animalia
- Phylum: Arthropoda
- Class: Insecta
- Order: Coleoptera
- Suborder: Polyphaga
- Infraorder: Cucujiformia
- Family: Cerambycidae
- Genus: Ochraethes
- Species: O. tulensis

Binomial name
- Ochraethes tulensis Bates, 1892

= Ochraethes tulensis =

Species of beetle

Ochraethes tulensis is a species of beetle in the Cerambycidae family. It was described by Bates in 1892.
