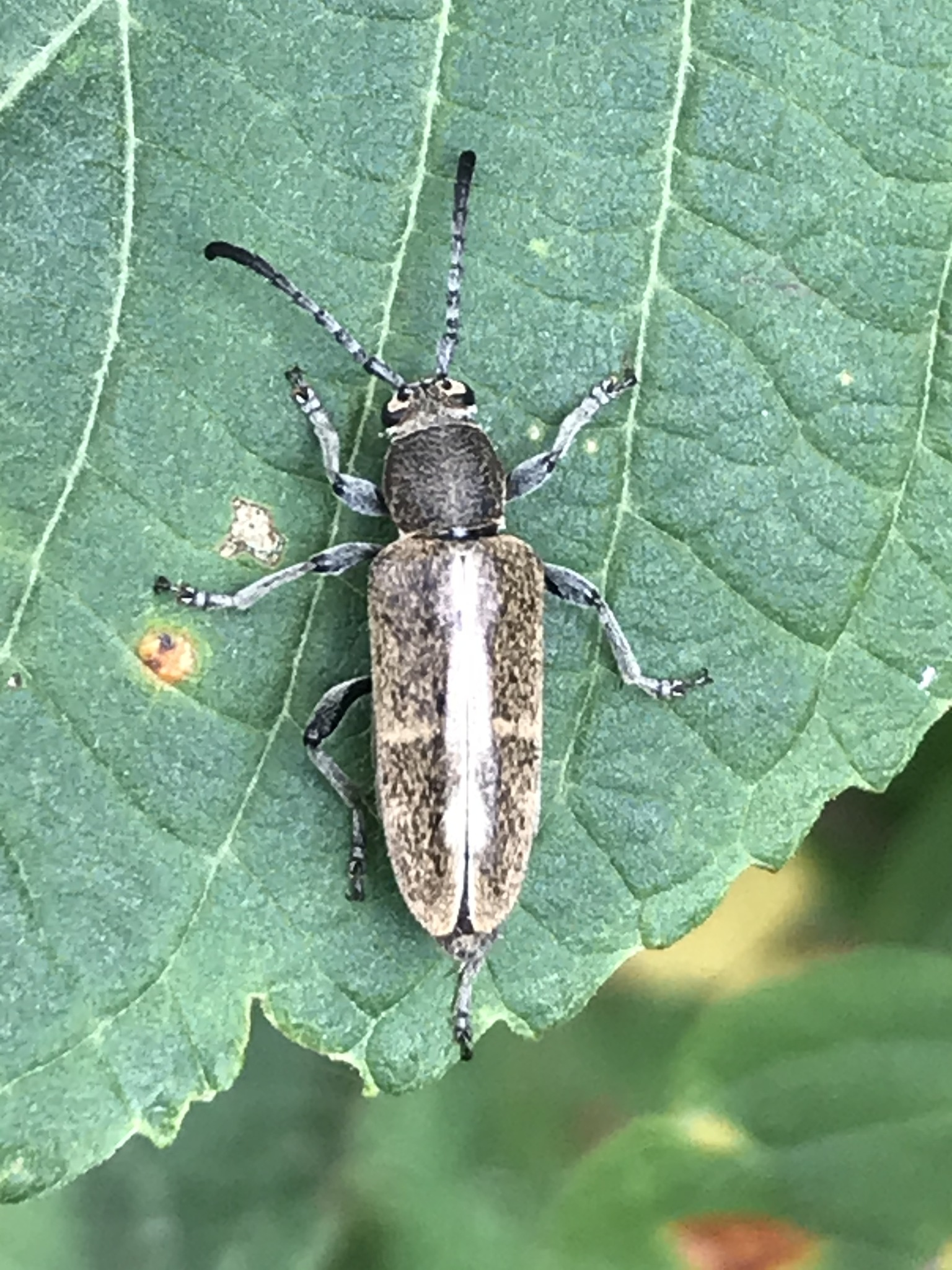

Scientific classification
- Kingdom: Animalia
- Phylum: Arthropoda
- Class: Insecta
- Order: Coleoptera
- Suborder: Polyphaga
- Infraorder: Cucujiformia
- Family: Cerambycidae
- Genus: Ochraethes
- Species: O. brevicornis

Binomial name
- Ochraethes brevicornis (Chevrolat, 1860)

Synonyms
- Clytus (Ochroesthes) brevicornis Chevrolat, 1860; Clytus (Ochroesthes) virescens Chevrolat, 1860; Ochraethes virescens

= Ochraethes brevicornis =

Species of beetle

Ochraethes brevicornis is a species of beetle in the family Cerambycidae. It was described by Louis Alexandre Auguste Chevrolat in 1860.
