= Tanyochraethes smithi =

Scientific classification
- Kingdom: Animalia
- Phylum: Arthropoda
- Class: Insecta
- Order: Coleoptera
- Suborder: Polyphaga
- Infraorder: Cucujiformia
- Family: Cerambycidae
- Genus: Tanyochraethes
- Species: T. smithi

Binomial name
- Tanyochraethes smithi Chemsak & Linsley, 1965

Species of beetle

Tanyochraethes smithi is a species of beetle in the family Cerambycidae. It was described by Chemsak and Linsley in 1965.
