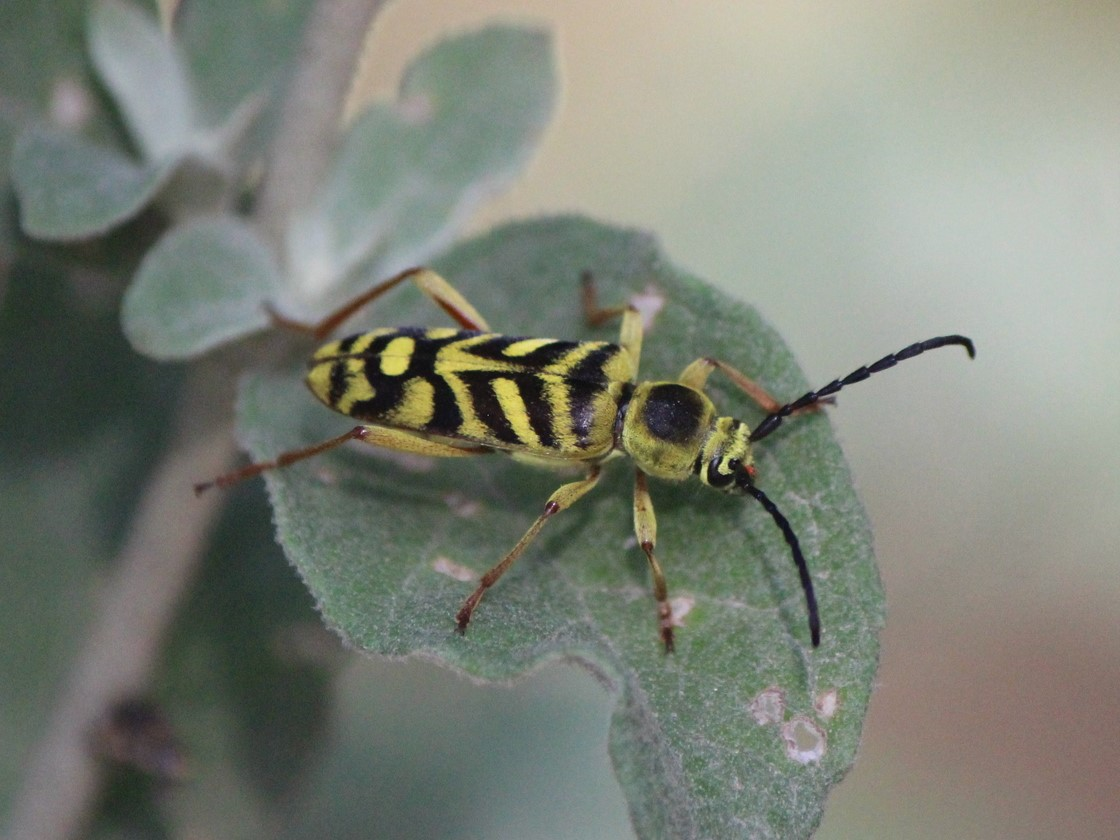

Scientific classification
- Kingdom: Animalia
- Phylum: Arthropoda
- Class: Insecta
- Order: Coleoptera
- Suborder: Polyphaga
- Infraorder: Cucujiformia
- Family: Cerambycidae
- Genus: Ochraethes
- Species: O. obliquus

Binomial name
- Ochraethes obliquus (Chevrolat, 1860)

Synonyms
- Clytus (Ochroesthes) obliquus Chevrolat, 1860; Ochraethes zebratus Bates, 1885

= Ochraethes obliquus =

Species of beetle

Ochraethes obliquus is a species of beetle in the family Cerambycidae. It was described by Louis Alexandre Auguste Chevrolat in 1860.
