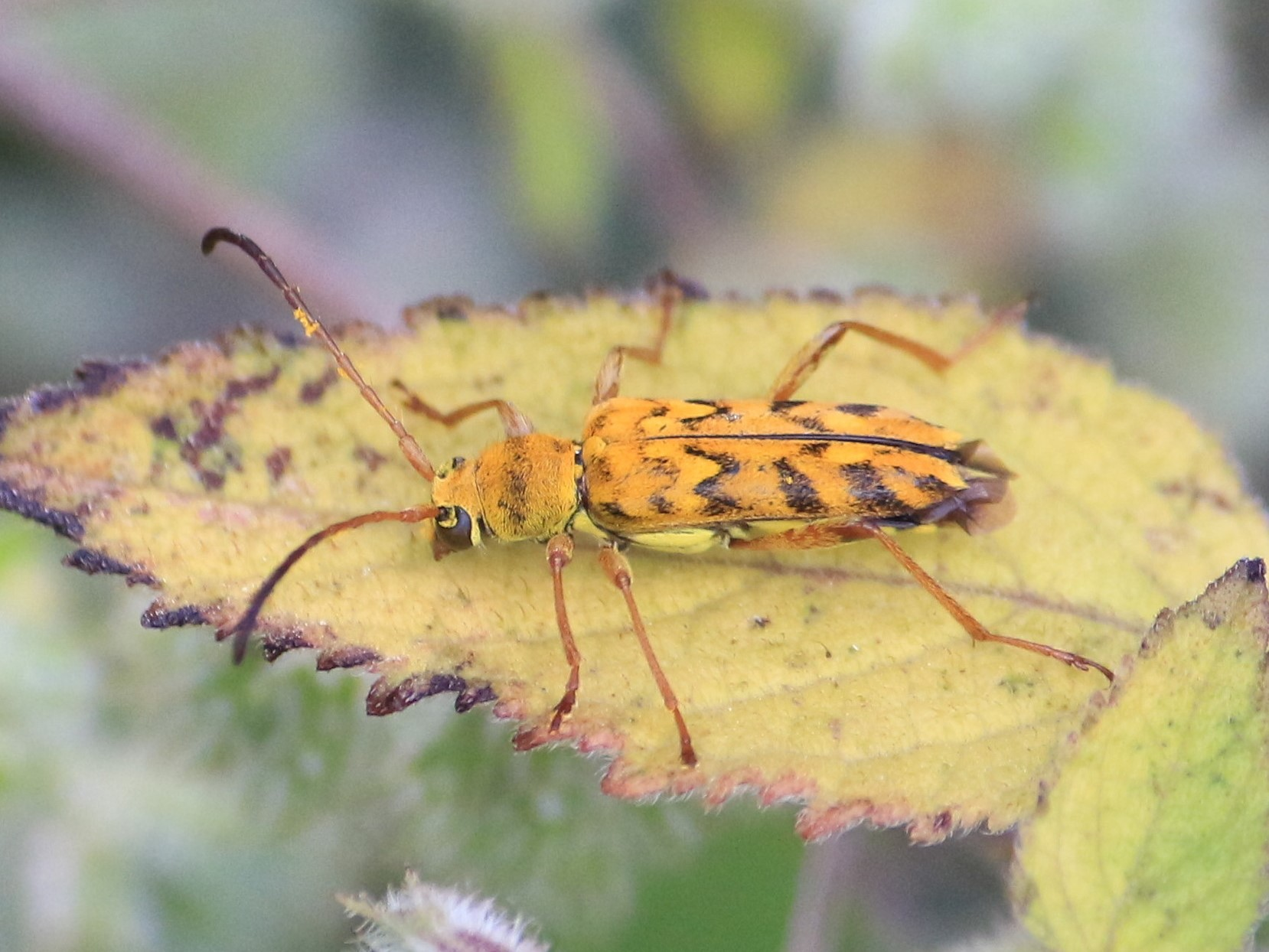

Scientific classification
- Domain: Eukaryota
- Kingdom: Animalia
- Phylum: Arthropoda
- Class: Insecta
- Order: Coleoptera
- Suborder: Polyphaga
- Infraorder: Cucujiformia
- Family: Cerambycidae
- Genus: Ochraethes
- Species: O. pollinosus

Binomial name
- Ochraethes pollinosus (Chevrolat, 1835)

= Ochraethes pollinosus =

Species of beetle

Ochraethes pollinosus is a species of beetle in the family Cerambycidae. It was described by Louis Alexandre Auguste Chevrolat in 1835.
