= Ochraethes tomentosus =

Scientific classification
- Domain: Eukaryota
- Kingdom: Animalia
- Phylum: Arthropoda
- Class: Insecta
- Order: Coleoptera
- Suborder: Polyphaga
- Infraorder: Cucujiformia
- Family: Cerambycidae
- Genus: Ochraethes
- Species: O. tomentosus

Binomial name
- Ochraethes tomentosus (Chevrolat, 1860)

Species of beetle

Ochraethes tomentosus is a species of beetle in the family Cerambycidae. It was described by Louis Alexandre Auguste Chevrolat in 1860.
