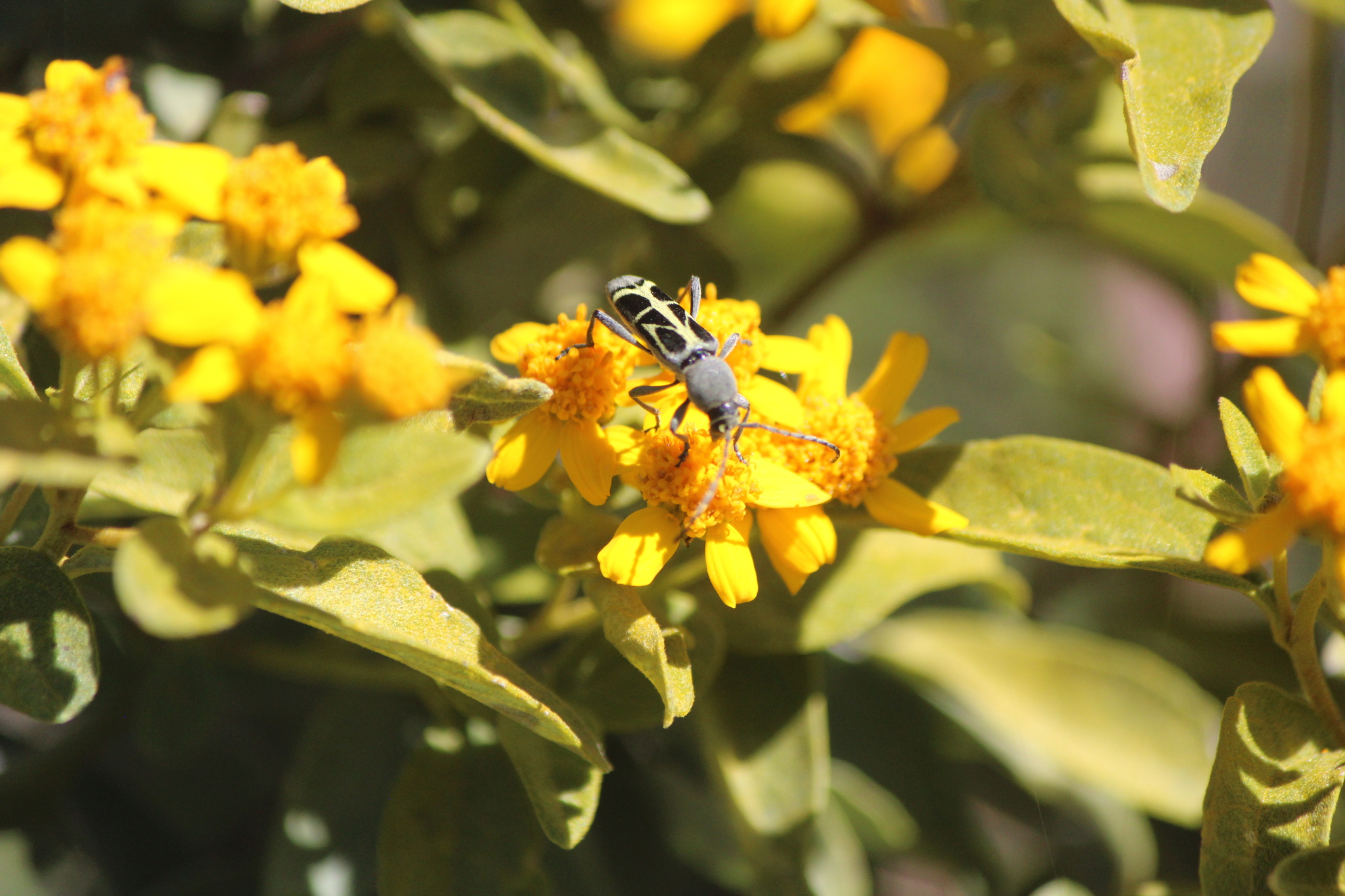

Scientific classification
- Kingdom: Animalia
- Phylum: Arthropoda
- Class: Insecta
- Order: Coleoptera
- Suborder: Polyphaga
- Infraorder: Cucujiformia
- Family: Cerambycidae
- Genus: Tanyochraethes
- Species: T. clathratus

Binomial name
- Tanyochraethes clathratus (Chevrolat, 1860)

= Tanyochraethes clathratus =

Species of beetle

Tanyochraethes clathratus is a species of beetle in the family Cerambycidae. It was described by Chevrolat in 1860.
