= Tanyochraethes anthophilus =

Scientific classification
- Domain: Eukaryota
- Kingdom: Animalia
- Phylum: Arthropoda
- Class: Insecta
- Order: Coleoptera
- Suborder: Polyphaga
- Infraorder: Cucujiformia
- Family: Cerambycidae
- Genus: Tanyochraethes
- Species: T. anthophilus

Binomial name
- Tanyochraethes anthophilus (Chevrolat, 1860)

Species of beetle

Tanyochraethes anthophilus is a species of beetle in the family Cerambycidae. It was described by Chevrolat in 1860.
