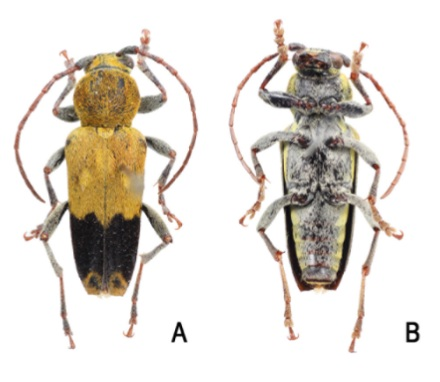

Scientific classification
- Kingdom: Animalia
- Phylum: Arthropoda
- Class: Insecta
- Order: Coleoptera
- Suborder: Polyphaga
- Infraorder: Cucujiformia
- Family: Cerambycidae
- Genus: Ochraethes
- Species: O. nigroapicalis

Binomial name
- Ochraethes nigroapicalis Perez-Flores & Toledo-Hernandez, 2022

= Ochraethes nigroapicalis =

Species of beetle

Ochraethes nigroapicalis is a species of beetle of the family Cerambycidae. It is found in Mexico (Jalisco, Nayarit and Zacatecas).

== Description ==
Adults reach a length of about 13.35 mm. The head, thorax, coxae, elytra, abdominal ventrites I–III and basal half of ventrites IV and V are integument black, while the antennae, palpi, legs, posterior half of abdominal ventrites IV and V range are reddish brown.

== Etymology ==
The species name is derived from Latin niger and apicis and refers to pubescence patterns on the male elytra, which is mostly black on the posterior half.
