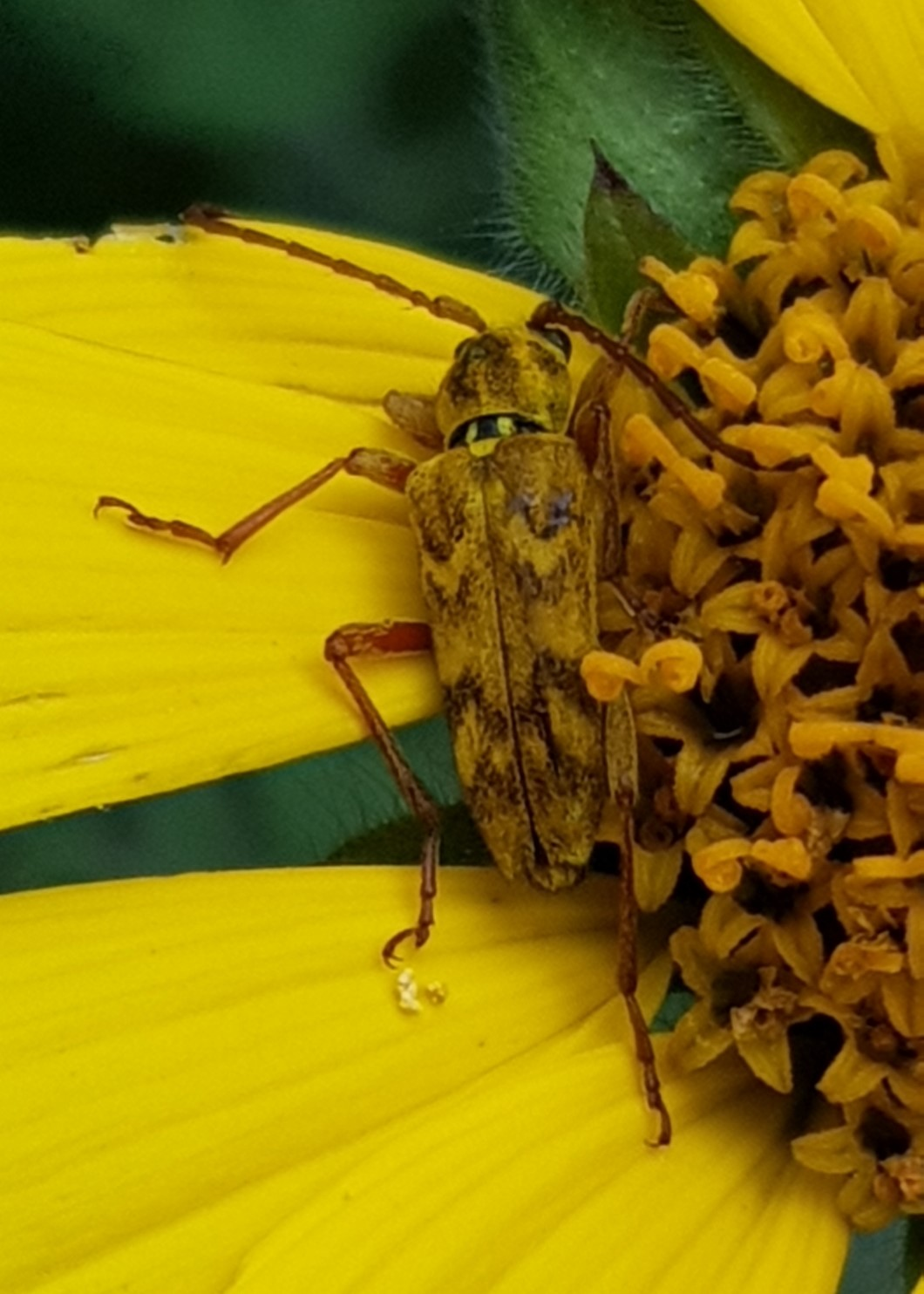
- Ochraethes z-littera

Scientific classification
- Kingdom: Animalia
- Phylum: Arthropoda
- Class: Insecta
- Order: Coleoptera
- Suborder: Polyphaga
- Infraorder: Cucujiformia
- Family: Cerambycidae
- Tribe: Clytini
- Genus: Ochraethes; Chevrolat, 1860

Synonyms
- Clytopsis Casey, 1912

= Ochraethes =

Genus of beetles

Ochraethes is a genus of beetles in the family Cerambycidae.

== Species ==
Ochraethes contains the following species:

- Ochraethes brevicornis (Chevrolat, 1860)
- Ochraethes cinereolus (Bates, 1892)
- Ochraethes citrinus (Chevrolat, 1860)
- Ochraethes confusus Perez-Flores & Toledo-Hernandez, 2022
- Ochraethes dimidiaticornis (Chevrolat, 1860)
- Ochraethes nevadensis Heffern, Botero & Santos-Silva, 2020
- Ochraethes nigrescens Chemsak & Linsley, 1974
- Ochraethes nigroapicalis Perez-Flores & Toledo-Hernandez, 2022
- Ochraethes nigropunctatus (Chevrolat, 1860)
- Ochraethes obliquus (Chevrolat, 1860)
- Ochraethes obscuricornis Bates, 1892
- Ochraethes palmeri Bates, 1880
- Ochraethes picticornis Bates, 1880
- Ochraethes pollinosus (Chevrolat, 1835)
- Ochraethes skillmani Wappes, Santos-Silva & Botero, 2018
- Ochraethes sommeri (Chevrolat, 1835)
- Ochraethes tomentosus (Chevrolat, 1860)
- Ochraethes tulensis Bates, 1892
- Ochraethes umbratilis Bates, 1885
- Ochraethes viridiventris (Chevrolat, 1860)
- Ochraethes z-littera (Chevrolat, 1860)
