= Ochraethes cinereolus =

Scientific classification
- Kingdom: Animalia
- Phylum: Arthropoda
- Class: Insecta
- Order: Coleoptera
- Suborder: Polyphaga
- Infraorder: Cucujiformia
- Family: Cerambycidae
- Genus: Ochraethes
- Species: O. cinereolus

Binomial name
- Ochraethes cinereolus (Bates, 1892)

Synonyms
- Trichoxys cinereolus Bates, 1892; Ochraethes octomaculata Chemsak & Noguera, 2001

Species of beetle

Ochraethes cinereolus is a species of beetle in the family Cerambycidae. It was described by Henry Walter Bates in 1892.
